

3001–3100 

|-bgcolor=#fefefe
| 3001 Michelangelo ||  ||  || January 24, 1982 || Anderson Mesa || E. Bowell || — || align=right | 7.6 km || 
|-id=002 bgcolor=#fefefe
| 3002 Delasalle ||  ||  || March 20, 1982 || La Silla || H. Debehogne || FLO || align=right | 6.3 km || 
|-id=003 bgcolor=#d6d6d6
| 3003 Konček || 1983 YH ||  || December 28, 1983 || Kleť || A. Mrkos || EOS || align=right | 19 km || 
|-id=004 bgcolor=#E9E9E9
| 3004 Knud || 1976 DD ||  || February 27, 1976 || La Silla || R. M. West || — || align=right | 2.9 km || 
|-id=005 bgcolor=#fefefe
| 3005 Pervictoralex ||  ||  || August 22, 1979 || La Silla || C.-I. Lagerkvist || NYS || align=right | 4.8 km || 
|-id=006 bgcolor=#fefefe
| 3006 Livadia ||  ||  || September 24, 1979 || Nauchnij || N. S. Chernykh || NYS || align=right | 8.3 km || 
|-id=007 bgcolor=#fefefe
| 3007 Reaves || 1979 UC ||  || October 17, 1979 || Anderson Mesa || E. Bowell || — || align=right | 11 km || 
|-id=008 bgcolor=#d6d6d6
| 3008 Nojiri || 1938 WA ||  || November 17, 1938 || Heidelberg || K. Reinmuth || THM || align=right | 16 km || 
|-id=009 bgcolor=#fefefe
| 3009 Coventry ||  ||  || September 22, 1973 || Nauchnij || N. S. Chernykh || FLO || align=right | 3.8 km || 
|-id=010 bgcolor=#d6d6d6
| 3010 Ushakov ||  ||  || September 27, 1978 || Nauchnij || L. I. Chernykh || THM || align=right | 14 km || 
|-id=011 bgcolor=#d6d6d6
| 3011 Chongqing ||  ||  || November 26, 1978 || Nanking || Purple Mountain Obs. || — || align=right | 12 km || 
|-id=012 bgcolor=#d6d6d6
| 3012 Minsk ||  ||  || August 27, 1979 || Nauchnij || N. S. Chernykh || — || align=right | 21 km || 
|-id=013 bgcolor=#fefefe
| 3013 Dobrovoleva ||  ||  || September 23, 1979 || Nauchnij || N. S. Chernykh || — || align=right | 11 km || 
|-id=014 bgcolor=#fefefe
| 3014 Huangsushu || 1979 TM ||  || October 11, 1979 || Nanking || Purple Mountain Obs. || EUT || align=right | 6.9 km || 
|-id=015 bgcolor=#d6d6d6
| 3015 Candy || 1980 VN ||  || November 9, 1980 || Anderson Mesa || E. Bowell || 7:4 || align=right | 25 km || 
|-id=016 bgcolor=#d6d6d6
| 3016 Meuse || 1981 EK ||  || March 1, 1981 || La Silla || H. Debehogne, G. DeSanctis || KOR || align=right | 9.9 km || 
|-id=017 bgcolor=#E9E9E9
| 3017 Petrovič || 1981 UL ||  || October 25, 1981 || Kleť || A. Mrkos || EUN || align=right | 13 km || 
|-id=018 bgcolor=#fefefe
| 3018 Godiva || 1982 KM ||  || May 21, 1982 || Anderson Mesa || E. Bowell || — || align=right | 8.2 km || 
|-id=019 bgcolor=#d6d6d6
| 3019 Kulin || 1940 AC ||  || January 7, 1940 || Konkoly || G. Kulin || KOR || align=right | 12 km || 
|-id=020 bgcolor=#E9E9E9
| 3020 Naudts || 1949 PR ||  || August 2, 1949 || Heidelberg || K. Reinmuth || slow || align=right | 12 km || 
|-id=021 bgcolor=#d6d6d6
| 3021 Lucubratio || 1967 CB ||  || February 6, 1967 || Zimmerwald || P. Wild || — || align=right | 24 km || 
|-id=022 bgcolor=#fefefe
| 3022 Dobermann || 1980 SH ||  || September 16, 1980 || Kleť || Z. Vávrová || H || align=right | 4.5 km || 
|-id=023 bgcolor=#fefefe
| 3023 Heard || 1981 JS ||  || May 5, 1981 || Anderson Mesa || E. Bowell || FLO || align=right | 5.0 km || 
|-id=024 bgcolor=#d6d6d6
| 3024 Hainan ||  ||  || October 23, 1981 || Nanking || Purple Mountain Obs. || 7:4 || align=right | 37 km || 
|-id=025 bgcolor=#d6d6d6
| 3025 Higson || 1982 QR ||  || August 20, 1982 || Palomar || C. S. Shoemaker, E. M. Shoemaker || ALA || align=right | 46 km || 
|-id=026 bgcolor=#d6d6d6
| 3026 Sarastro ||  ||  || October 12, 1977 || Zimmerwald || P. Wild || — || align=right | 16 km || 
|-id=027 bgcolor=#E9E9E9
| 3027 Shavarsh ||  ||  || August 8, 1978 || Nauchnij || N. S. Chernykh || MIS || align=right | 13 km || 
|-id=028 bgcolor=#d6d6d6
| 3028 Zhangguoxi ||  ||  || October 9, 1978 || Nanking || Purple Mountain Obs. || EOS || align=right | 26 km || 
|-id=029 bgcolor=#fefefe
| 3029 Sanders ||  ||  || March 1, 1981 || Siding Spring || S. J. Bus || FLO || align=right | 6.0 km || 
|-id=030 bgcolor=#fefefe
| 3030 Vehrenberg ||  ||  || March 1, 1981 || Siding Spring || S. J. Bus || — || align=right | 4.3 km || 
|-id=031 bgcolor=#fefefe
| 3031 Houston || 1984 CX ||  || February 8, 1984 || Anderson Mesa || E. Bowell || FLO || align=right | 6.4 km || 
|-id=032 bgcolor=#d6d6d6
| 3032 Evans ||  ||  || February 8, 1984 || Anderson Mesa || E. Bowell || KOR || align=right | 14 km || 
|-id=033 bgcolor=#fefefe
| 3033 Holbaek || 1984 EJ ||  || March 5, 1984 || Brorfelde || K. Augustesen, P. Jensen, H. J. Fogh Olsen || FLOslow || align=right | 8.4 km || 
|-id=034 bgcolor=#fefefe
| 3034 Climenhaga || A917 SE ||  || September 24, 1917 || Heidelberg || M. F. Wolf || moon || align=right | 8.5 km || 
|-id=035 bgcolor=#E9E9E9
| 3035 Chambers || A924 EJ ||  || March 7, 1924 || Heidelberg || K. Reinmuth || MIS || align=right | 14 km || 
|-id=036 bgcolor=#d6d6d6
| 3036 Krat || 1937 TO ||  || October 11, 1937 || Crimea-Simeis || G. N. Neujmin || ALA || align=right | 43 km || 
|-id=037 bgcolor=#E9E9E9
| 3037 Alku || 1944 BA ||  || January 17, 1944 || Turku || Y. Väisälä || — || align=right | 30 km || 
|-id=038 bgcolor=#fefefe
| 3038 Bernes ||  ||  || August 31, 1978 || Nauchnij || N. S. Chernykh || — || align=right | 3.6 km || 
|-id=039 bgcolor=#E9E9E9
| 3039 Yangel ||  ||  || September 26, 1978 || Nauchnij || L. V. Zhuravleva || — || align=right | 9.4 km || 
|-id=040 bgcolor=#FA8072
| 3040 Kozai || 1979 BA ||  || January 23, 1979 || Cerro Tololo || W. Liller || — || align=right | 3.4 km || 
|-id=041 bgcolor=#E9E9E9
| 3041 Webb || 1980 GD ||  || April 15, 1980 || Anderson Mesa || E. Bowell || EUN || align=right | 8.2 km || 
|-id=042 bgcolor=#fefefe
| 3042 Zelinsky ||  ||  || March 1, 1981 || Siding Spring || S. J. Bus || FLO || align=right | 3.9 km || 
|-id=043 bgcolor=#fefefe
| 3043 San Diego || 1982 SA ||  || September 20, 1982 || Palomar || E. F. Helin || Hslow || align=right | 5.0 km || 
|-id=044 bgcolor=#d6d6d6
| 3044 Saltykov ||  ||  || September 2, 1983 || Nauchnij || N. V. Metlova, N. E. Kuročkin || — || align=right | 25 km || 
|-id=045 bgcolor=#d6d6d6
| 3045 Alois || 1984 AW ||  || January 8, 1984 || Anderson Mesa || J. Wagner || — || align=right | 27 km || 
|-id=046 bgcolor=#d6d6d6
| 3046 Molière || 4120 P-L ||  || September 24, 1960 || Palomar || PLS || — || align=right | 21 km || 
|-id=047 bgcolor=#E9E9E9
| 3047 Goethe || 6091 P-L ||  || September 24, 1960 || Palomar || PLS || — || align=right | 5.8 km || 
|-id=048 bgcolor=#fefefe
| 3048 Guangzhou ||  ||  || October 8, 1964 || Nanking || Purple Mountain Obs. || NYS || align=right | 6.3 km || 
|-id=049 bgcolor=#d6d6d6
| 3049 Kuzbass || 1968 FH ||  || March 28, 1968 || Nauchnij || T. M. Smirnova || THM || align=right | 20 km || 
|-id=050 bgcolor=#fefefe
| 3050 Carrera || 1972 NW ||  || July 13, 1972 || Cerro El Roble || C. Torres || — || align=right | 4.5 km || 
|-id=051 bgcolor=#E9E9E9
| 3051 Nantong || 1974 YP ||  || December 19, 1974 || Nanking || Purple Mountain Obs. || — || align=right | 16 km || 
|-id=052 bgcolor=#fefefe
| 3052 Herzen ||  ||  || December 16, 1976 || Nauchnij || L. I. Chernykh || — || align=right | 11 km || 
|-id=053 bgcolor=#fefefe
| 3053 Dresden || 1977 QS ||  || August 18, 1977 || Nauchnij || N. S. Chernykh || — || align=right | 3.5 km || 
|-id=054 bgcolor=#d6d6d6
| 3054 Strugatskia ||  ||  || September 11, 1977 || Nauchnij || N. S. Chernykh || THM || align=right | 27 km || 
|-id=055 bgcolor=#E9E9E9
| 3055 Annapavlova ||  ||  || October 4, 1978 || Nauchnij || T. M. Smirnova || MAR || align=right | 9.4 km || 
|-id=056 bgcolor=#fefefe
| 3056 INAG ||  ||  || November 1, 1978 || Caussols || K. Tomita || — || align=right | 5.2 km || 
|-id=057 bgcolor=#fefefe
| 3057 Mälaren || 1981 EG ||  || March 9, 1981 || Anderson Mesa || E. Bowell || — || align=right | 5.7 km || 
|-id=058 bgcolor=#fefefe
| 3058 Delmary ||  ||  || March 1, 1981 || Siding Spring || S. J. Bus || — || align=right | 4.1 km || 
|-id=059 bgcolor=#fefefe
| 3059 Pryor ||  ||  || March 3, 1981 || Siding Spring || S. J. Bus || NYS || align=right | 5.2 km || 
|-id=060 bgcolor=#fefefe
| 3060 Delcano ||  ||  || September 12, 1982 || Zimmerwald || P. Wild || — || align=right | 7.1 km || 
|-id=061 bgcolor=#d6d6d6
| 3061 Cook ||  ||  || October 21, 1982 || Anderson Mesa || E. Bowell || — || align=right | 23 km || 
|-id=062 bgcolor=#d6d6d6
| 3062 Wren || 1982 XC ||  || December 14, 1982 || Anderson Mesa || E. Bowell || EOS || align=right | 23 km || 
|-id=063 bgcolor=#C2FFFF
| 3063 Makhaon || 1983 PV ||  || August 4, 1983 || Nauchnij || L. G. Karachkina || L4 || align=right | 112 km || 
|-id=064 bgcolor=#fefefe
| 3064 Zimmer ||  ||  || January 28, 1984 || Anderson Mesa || E. Bowell || NYSslow || align=right | 13 km || 
|-id=065 bgcolor=#E9E9E9
| 3065 Sarahill || 1984 CV ||  || February 8, 1984 || Anderson Mesa || E. Bowell || — || align=right | 19 km || 
|-id=066 bgcolor=#E9E9E9
| 3066 McFadden || 1984 EO ||  || March 1, 1984 || Anderson Mesa || E. Bowell || — || align=right | 14 km || 
|-id=067 bgcolor=#fefefe
| 3067 Akhmatova ||  ||  || October 14, 1982 || Nauchnij || L. V. Zhuravleva, L. G. Karachkina || — || align=right | 6.3 km || 
|-id=068 bgcolor=#fefefe
| 3068 Khanina ||  ||  || December 23, 1982 || Nauchnij || L. G. Karachkina || FLO || align=right | 6.5 km || 
|-id=069 bgcolor=#fefefe
| 3069 Heyrovský ||  ||  || October 16, 1982 || Kleť || Z. Vávrová || NYS || align=right | 4.7 km || 
|-id=070 bgcolor=#fefefe
| 3070 Aitken || 1949 GK ||  || April 4, 1949 || Brooklyn || Indiana University || — || align=right | 5.0 km || 
|-id=071 bgcolor=#d6d6d6
| 3071 Nesterov ||  ||  || March 28, 1973 || Nauchnij || T. M. Smirnova || THM || align=right | 20 km || 
|-id=072 bgcolor=#fefefe
| 3072 Vilnius ||  ||  || September 5, 1978 || Nauchnij || N. S. Chernykh || FLO || align=right | 4.3 km || 
|-id=073 bgcolor=#fefefe
| 3073 Kursk ||  ||  || September 24, 1979 || Nauchnij || N. S. Chernykh || FLOmoon || align=right | 4.5 km || 
|-id=074 bgcolor=#fefefe
| 3074 Popov ||  ||  || December 24, 1979 || Nauchnij || L. V. Zhuravleva || NYS || align=right | 9.9 km || 
|-id=075 bgcolor=#fefefe
| 3075 Bornmann ||  ||  || March 1, 1981 || Siding Spring || S. J. Bus || — || align=right | 4.5 km || 
|-id=076 bgcolor=#fefefe
| 3076 Garber ||  ||  || September 13, 1982 || Harvard Observatory || Oak Ridge Observatory || — || align=right | 4.9 km || 
|-id=077 bgcolor=#fefefe
| 3077 Henderson || 1982 SK ||  || September 22, 1982 || Anderson Mesa || E. Bowell || — || align=right | 5.2 km || 
|-id=078 bgcolor=#d6d6d6
| 3078 Horrocks || 1984 FG ||  || March 31, 1984 || Anderson Mesa || E. Bowell || — || align=right | 28 km || 
|-id=079 bgcolor=#E9E9E9
| 3079 Schiller || 2578 P-L ||  || September 24, 1960 || Palomar || PLS || — || align=right | 6.7 km || 
|-id=080 bgcolor=#E9E9E9
| 3080 Moisseiev || 1935 TE ||  || October 3, 1935 || Crimea-Simeis || P. F. Shajn || EUN || align=right | 13 km || 
|-id=081 bgcolor=#fefefe
| 3081 Martinůboh || 1971 UP ||  || October 26, 1971 || Hamburg-Bergedorf || L. Kohoutek || — || align=right | 5.3 km || 
|-id=082 bgcolor=#E9E9E9
| 3082 Dzhalil || 1972 KE ||  || May 17, 1972 || Nauchnij || T. M. Smirnova || — || align=right | 18 km || 
|-id=083 bgcolor=#fefefe
| 3083 OAFA || 1974 MH ||  || June 17, 1974 || El Leoncito || Félix Aguilar Obs. || FLO || align=right | 3.6 km || 
|-id=084 bgcolor=#fefefe
| 3084 Kondratyuk ||  ||  || August 19, 1977 || Nauchnij || N. S. Chernykh || — || align=right | 5.4 km || 
|-id=085 bgcolor=#fefefe
| 3085 Donna || 1980 DA ||  || February 18, 1980 || Harvard Observatory || Harvard Obs. || — || align=right | 7.0 km || 
|-id=086 bgcolor=#fefefe
| 3086 Kalbaugh || 1980 XE ||  || December 4, 1980 || Anderson Mesa || E. Bowell || H || align=right | 4.6 km || 
|-id=087 bgcolor=#d6d6d6
| 3087 Beatrice Tinsley ||  ||  || August 30, 1981 || Lake Tekapo || A. C. Gilmore, P. M. Kilmartin || — || align=right | 6.6 km || 
|-id=088 bgcolor=#d6d6d6
| 3088 Jinxiuzhonghua ||  ||  || October 24, 1981 || Nanking || Purple Mountain Obs. || EOS || align=right | 17 km || 
|-id=089 bgcolor=#d6d6d6
| 3089 Oujianquan ||  ||  || December 3, 1981 || Nanking || Purple Mountain Obs. || — || align=right | 36 km || 
|-id=090 bgcolor=#d6d6d6
| 3090 Tjossem || 1982 AN ||  || January 4, 1982 || Palomar || J. Gibson || VER || align=right | 14 km || 
|-id=091 bgcolor=#fefefe
| 3091 van den Heuvel || 6081 P-L ||  || September 24, 1960 || Palomar || PLS || NYS || align=right | 4.3 km || 
|-id=092 bgcolor=#d6d6d6
| 3092 Herodotus || 6550 P-L ||  || September 24, 1960 || Palomar || PLS || 7:4 || align=right | 30 km || 
|-id=093 bgcolor=#E9E9E9
| 3093 Bergholz || 1971 MG ||  || June 28, 1971 || Nauchnij || T. M. Smirnova || — || align=right | 13 km || 
|-id=094 bgcolor=#E9E9E9
| 3094 Chukokkala ||  ||  || March 23, 1979 || Nauchnij || N. S. Chernykh || — || align=right | 23 km || 
|-id=095 bgcolor=#d6d6d6
| 3095 Omarkhayyam ||  ||  || September 8, 1980 || Nauchnij || L. V. Zhuravleva || 7:4 || align=right | 30 km || 
|-id=096 bgcolor=#E9E9E9
| 3096 Bezruč ||  ||  || August 28, 1981 || Kleť || Z. Vávrová || ADE || align=right | 17 km || 
|-id=097 bgcolor=#d6d6d6
| 3097 Tacitus || 2011 P-L ||  || September 24, 1960 || Palomar || PLS || — || align=right | 21 km || 
|-id=098 bgcolor=#fefefe
| 3098 van Sprang || 4579 P-L ||  || September 24, 1960 || Palomar || PLS || — || align=right | 3.6 km || 
|-id=099 bgcolor=#d6d6d6
| 3099 Hergenrother || 1940 GF ||  || April 3, 1940 || Turku || Y. Väisälä || — || align=right | 15 km || 
|-id=100 bgcolor=#fefefe
| 3100 Zimmerman ||  ||  || March 13, 1977 || Nauchnij || N. S. Chernykh || — || align=right | 5.3 km || 
|}

3101–3200 

|-bgcolor=#fefefe
| 3101 Goldberger || 1978 GB ||  || April 11, 1978 || Palomar || E. F. Helin, G. Grueff, J. V. Wall || H || align=right | 4.5 km || 
|-id=102 bgcolor=#FFC2E0
| 3102 Krok || 1981 QA ||  || August 21, 1981 || Kleť || L. Brožek || AMO +1kmslow || align=right | 1.6 km || 
|-id=103 bgcolor=#FFC2E0
| 3103 Eger || 1982 BB ||  || January 20, 1982 || Piszkéstető || M. Lovas || APO +1km || align=right | 1.5 km || 
|-id=104 bgcolor=#d6d6d6
| 3104 Dürer ||  ||  || January 24, 1982 || Anderson Mesa || E. Bowell || — || align=right | 17 km || 
|-id=105 bgcolor=#fefefe
| 3105 Stumpff || A907 PB ||  || August 8, 1907 || Heidelberg || A. Kopff || FLO || align=right | 7.0 km || 
|-id=106 bgcolor=#d6d6d6
| 3106 Morabito || 1981 EE ||  || March 9, 1981 || Anderson Mesa || E. Bowell || MEL || align=right | 26 km || 
|-id=107 bgcolor=#fefefe
| 3107 Weaver ||  ||  || May 5, 1981 || Palomar || C. S. Shoemaker || — || align=right | 5.8 km || 
|-id=108 bgcolor=#fefefe
| 3108 Lyubov || 1972 QM ||  || August 18, 1972 || Nauchnij || L. V. Zhuravleva || — || align=right | 4.4 km || 
|-id=109 bgcolor=#fefefe
| 3109 Machin || 1974 DC ||  || February 19, 1974 || Hamburg-Bergedorf || L. Kohoutek || — || align=right | 24 km || 
|-id=110 bgcolor=#E9E9E9
| 3110 Wagman || 1975 SC ||  || September 28, 1975 || Anderson Mesa || H. L. Giclas || — || align=right | 8.0 km || 
|-id=111 bgcolor=#fefefe
| 3111 Misuzu ||  ||  || February 19, 1977 || Kiso || H. Kosai, K. Furukawa || — || align=right | 4.6 km || 
|-id=112 bgcolor=#fefefe
| 3112 Velimir ||  ||  || August 22, 1977 || Nauchnij || N. S. Chernykh || NYS || align=right | 13 km || 
|-id=113 bgcolor=#fefefe
| 3113 Chizhevskij || 1978 RO ||  || September 1, 1978 || Nauchnij || N. S. Chernykh || — || align=right | 4.9 km || 
|-id=114 bgcolor=#fefefe
| 3114 Ercilla ||  ||  || March 19, 1980 || Cerro El Roble || University of Chile || NYS || align=right | 5.0 km || 
|-id=115 bgcolor=#E9E9E9
| 3115 Baily || 1981 PL ||  || August 3, 1981 || Anderson Mesa || E. Bowell || — || align=right | 17 km || 
|-id=116 bgcolor=#fefefe
| 3116 Goodricke || 1983 CF ||  || February 11, 1983 || Anderson Mesa || E. Bowell || FLO || align=right | 7.8 km || 
|-id=117 bgcolor=#d6d6d6
| 3117 Niepce ||  ||  || February 11, 1983 || Anderson Mesa || N. G. Thomas || KOR || align=right | 11 km || 
|-id=118 bgcolor=#d6d6d6
| 3118 Claytonsmith || 1974 OD ||  || July 19, 1974 || El Leoncito || Félix Aguilar Obs. || — || align=right | 37 km || 
|-id=119 bgcolor=#d6d6d6
| 3119 Dobronravin || 1972 YX ||  || December 30, 1972 || Nauchnij || T. M. Smirnova || — || align=right | 16 km || 
|-id=120 bgcolor=#d6d6d6
| 3120 Dangrania || 1979 RZ ||  || September 14, 1979 || Nauchnij || N. S. Chernykh || — || align=right | 15 km || 
|-id=121 bgcolor=#fefefe
| 3121 Tamines || 1981 EV ||  || March 2, 1981 || La Silla || H. Debehogne, G. DeSanctis || — || align=right | 6.1 km || 
|-id=122 bgcolor=#FFC2E0
| 3122 Florence ||  ||  || March 2, 1981 || Siding Spring || S. J. Bus || AMO +1kmPHAmoon || align=right | 4.9 km || 
|-id=123 bgcolor=#fefefe
| 3123 Dunham ||  ||  || August 30, 1981 || Anderson Mesa || E. Bowell || slow || align=right | 12 km || 
|-id=124 bgcolor=#E9E9E9
| 3124 Kansas || 1981 VB ||  || November 3, 1981 || Kitt Peak || D. J. Tholen || PAD || align=right | 11 km || 
|-id=125 bgcolor=#E9E9E9
| 3125 Hay ||  ||  || January 24, 1982 || Anderson Mesa || E. Bowell || — || align=right | 15 km || 
|-id=126 bgcolor=#d6d6d6
| 3126 Davydov ||  ||  || October 8, 1969 || Nauchnij || L. I. Chernykh || EOS || align=right | 14 km || 
|-id=127 bgcolor=#E9E9E9
| 3127 Bagration ||  ||  || September 27, 1973 || Nauchnij || L. I. Chernykh || — || align=right | 8.4 km || 
|-id=128 bgcolor=#d6d6d6
| 3128 Obruchev ||  ||  || March 23, 1979 || Nauchnij || N. S. Chernykh || THM || align=right | 20 km || 
|-id=129 bgcolor=#E9E9E9
| 3129 Bonestell ||  ||  || June 25, 1979 || Siding Spring || E. F. Helin, S. J. Bus || — || align=right | 7.2 km || 
|-id=130 bgcolor=#fefefe
| 3130 Hillary || 1981 YO ||  || December 20, 1981 || Kleť || A. Mrkos || NYS || align=right | 13 km || 
|-id=131 bgcolor=#d6d6d6
| 3131 Mason-Dixon ||  ||  || January 24, 1982 || Anderson Mesa || E. Bowell || KOR || align=right | 13 km || 
|-id=132 bgcolor=#d6d6d6
| 3132 Landgraf || 1940 WL ||  || November 29, 1940 || Turku || L. Oterma || — || align=right | 36 km || 
|-id=133 bgcolor=#fefefe
| 3133 Sendai || A907 TC ||  || October 4, 1907 || Heidelberg || A. Kopff || FLO || align=right | 7.2 km || 
|-id=134 bgcolor=#d6d6d6
| 3134 Kostinsky || A921 VA ||  || November 5, 1921 || Crimea-Simeis || S. Belyavskyj || HIL3:2 || align=right | 50 km || 
|-id=135 bgcolor=#fefefe
| 3135 Lauer ||  ||  || March 1, 1981 || Siding Spring || S. J. Bus || — || align=right | 5.0 km || 
|-id=136 bgcolor=#d6d6d6
| 3136 Anshan ||  ||  || November 18, 1981 || Nanking || Purple Mountain Obs. || — || align=right | 19 km || 
|-id=137 bgcolor=#fefefe
| 3137 Horky ||  ||  || September 16, 1982 || Kleť || A. Mrkos || — || align=right | 6.7 km || 
|-id=138 bgcolor=#fefefe
| 3138 Ciney || 1980 KL ||  || May 22, 1980 || La Silla || H. Debehogne || FLOslow || align=right | 5.5 km || 
|-id=139 bgcolor=#d6d6d6
| 3139 Shantou ||  ||  || November 11, 1980 || Nanking || Purple Mountain Obs. || ALA || align=right | 37 km || 
|-id=140 bgcolor=#d6d6d6
| 3140 Stellafane || 1983 AO ||  || January 9, 1983 || Anderson Mesa || B. A. Skiff || EOS || align=right | 20 km || 
|-id=141 bgcolor=#d6d6d6
| 3141 Buchar || 1984 RH ||  || September 2, 1984 || Kleť || A. Mrkos || 7:4 || align=right | 36 km || 
|-id=142 bgcolor=#E9E9E9
| 3142 Kilopi || 1937 AC ||  || January 9, 1937 || Nice || A. Patry || — || align=right | 8.0 km || 
|-id=143 bgcolor=#d6d6d6
| 3143 Genecampbell || 1980 UA ||  || October 31, 1980 || Harvard Observatory || Harvard Obs. || KOR || align=right | 8.5 km || 
|-id=144 bgcolor=#fefefe
| 3144 Brosche ||  ||  || October 10, 1931 || Heidelberg || K. Reinmuth || FLO || align=right | 4.4 km || 
|-id=145 bgcolor=#fefefe
| 3145 Walter Adams || 1955 RY ||  || September 14, 1955 || Brooklyn || Indiana University || — || align=right | 3.4 km || 
|-id=146 bgcolor=#fefefe
| 3146 Dato || 1972 KG ||  || May 17, 1972 || Nauchnij || T. M. Smirnova || KLI || align=right | 11 km || 
|-id=147 bgcolor=#E9E9E9
| 3147 Samantha ||  ||  || December 16, 1976 || Nauchnij || L. I. Chernykh || — || align=right | 10 km || 
|-id=148 bgcolor=#d6d6d6
| 3148 Grechko ||  ||  || September 24, 1979 || Nauchnij || N. S. Chernykh || THM || align=right | 17 km || 
|-id=149 bgcolor=#fefefe
| 3149 Okudzhava || 1981 SH ||  || September 22, 1981 || Kleť || Z. Vávrová || — || align=right | 4.6 km || 
|-id=150 bgcolor=#d6d6d6
| 3150 Tosa || 1983 CB ||  || February 11, 1983 || Geisei || T. Seki || ALA || align=right | 33 km || 
|-id=151 bgcolor=#E9E9E9
| 3151 Talbot || 1983 HF ||  || April 18, 1983 || Anderson Mesa || N. G. Thomas || — || align=right | 14 km || 
|-id=152 bgcolor=#E9E9E9
| 3152 Jones || 1983 LF ||  || June 7, 1983 || Lake Tekapo || A. C. Gilmore, P. M. Kilmartin || JNS || align=right | 31 km || 
|-id=153 bgcolor=#fefefe
| 3153 Lincoln ||  ||  || September 28, 1984 || Anderson Mesa || B. A. Skiff || V || align=right | 5.0 km || 
|-id=154 bgcolor=#d6d6d6
| 3154 Grant ||  ||  || September 28, 1984 || Anderson Mesa || B. A. Skiff || THM || align=right | 13 km || 
|-id=155 bgcolor=#fefefe
| 3155 Lee ||  ||  || September 28, 1984 || Anderson Mesa || B. A. Skiff || V || align=right | 7.2 km || 
|-id=156 bgcolor=#d6d6d6
| 3156 Ellington || 1953 EE ||  || March 15, 1953 || Uccle || A. Schmitt || 627 || align=right | 31 km || 
|-id=157 bgcolor=#d6d6d6
| 3157 Novikov ||  ||  || September 25, 1973 || Nauchnij || L. V. Zhuravleva || — || align=right | 30 km || 
|-id=158 bgcolor=#E9E9E9
| 3158 Anga ||  ||  || September 24, 1976 || Nauchnij || N. S. Chernykh || MAR || align=right | 7.3 km || 
|-id=159 bgcolor=#E9E9E9
| 3159 Prokofʹev ||  ||  || October 26, 1976 || Nauchnij || T. M. Smirnova || MAR || align=right | 9.8 km || 
|-id=160 bgcolor=#fefefe
| 3160 Angerhofer || 1980 LE ||  || June 14, 1980 || Anderson Mesa || E. Bowell || — || align=right | 4.8 km || 
|-id=161 bgcolor=#E9E9E9
| 3161 Beadell ||  ||  || October 9, 1980 || Palomar || C. S. Shoemaker || — || align=right | 14 km || 
|-id=162 bgcolor=#d6d6d6
| 3162 Nostalgia || 1980 YH ||  || December 16, 1980 || Anderson Mesa || E. Bowell || — || align=right | 29 km || 
|-id=163 bgcolor=#FA8072
| 3163 Randi || 1981 QM ||  || August 28, 1981 || Palomar || C. T. Kowal || — || align=right | 3.9 km || 
|-id=164 bgcolor=#d6d6d6
| 3164 Prast || 6562 P-L ||  || September 24, 1960 || Palomar || PLS || THM || align=right | 19 km || 
|-id=165 bgcolor=#fefefe
| 3165 Mikawa || 1984 QE ||  || August 31, 1984 || Toyota || K. Suzuki, T. Urata || FLO || align=right | 7.7 km || 
|-id=166 bgcolor=#fefefe
| 3166 Klondike || 1940 FG ||  || March 30, 1940 || Turku || Y. Väisälä || — || align=right | 7.8 km || 
|-id=167 bgcolor=#E9E9E9
| 3167 Babcock || 1955 RS ||  || September 13, 1955 || Brooklyn || Indiana University || — || align=right | 13 km || 
|-id=168 bgcolor=#d6d6d6
| 3168 Lomnický Štít || 1980 XM ||  || December 1, 1980 || Kleť || A. Mrkos || EOS || align=right | 13 km || 
|-id=169 bgcolor=#fefefe
| 3169 Ostro || 1981 LA ||  || June 4, 1981 || Anderson Mesa || E. Bowell || Hmoon || align=right | 4.7 km || 
|-id=170 bgcolor=#d6d6d6
| 3170 Dzhanibekov ||  ||  || September 24, 1979 || Nauchnij || N. S. Chernykh || KOR || align=right | 9.6 km || 
|-id=171 bgcolor=#d6d6d6
| 3171 Wangshouguan || 1979 WO ||  || November 19, 1979 || Nanking || Purple Mountain Obs. || — || align=right | 39 km || 
|-id=172 bgcolor=#fefefe
| 3172 Hirst || 1981 WW ||  || November 24, 1981 || Anderson Mesa || E. Bowell || NYS || align=right | 5.6 km || 
|-id=173 bgcolor=#fefefe
| 3173 McNaught || 1981 WY ||  || November 24, 1981 || Anderson Mesa || E. Bowell || — || align=right | 6.0 km || 
|-id=174 bgcolor=#d6d6d6
| 3174 Alcock || 1984 UV ||  || October 26, 1984 || Anderson Mesa || E. Bowell || THM || align=right | 19 km || 
|-id=175 bgcolor=#fefefe
| 3175 Netto || 1979 YP ||  || December 16, 1979 || La Silla || H. Debehogne, E. R. Netto || — || align=right | 5.9 km || 
|-id=176 bgcolor=#d6d6d6
| 3176 Paolicchi ||  ||  || November 13, 1980 || Piszkéstető || Z. Knežević || — || align=right | 41 km || 
|-id=177 bgcolor=#E9E9E9
| 3177 Chillicothe || 1934 AK ||  || January 8, 1934 || Flagstaff || H. L. Giclas || — || align=right | 15 km || 
|-id=178 bgcolor=#E9E9E9
| 3178 Yoshitsune || 1984 WA ||  || November 21, 1984 || Toyota || K. Suzuki, T. Urata || — || align=right | 14 km || 
|-id=179 bgcolor=#d6d6d6
| 3179 Beruti || 1962 FA ||  || March 31, 1962 || La Plata Observatory || La Plata Obs. || THM || align=right | 21 km || 
|-id=180 bgcolor=#fefefe
| 3180 Morgan || 1962 RO ||  || September 7, 1962 || Brooklyn || Indiana University || FLO || align=right | 4.3 km || 
|-id=181 bgcolor=#fefefe
| 3181 Ahnert || 1964 EC ||  || March 8, 1964 || Tautenburg Observatory || F. Börngen || FLO || align=right | 8.0 km || 
|-id=182 bgcolor=#E9E9E9
| 3182 Shimanto || 1984 WC ||  || November 27, 1984 || Geisei || T. Seki || EUN || align=right | 8.9 km || 
|-id=183 bgcolor=#d6d6d6
| 3183 Franzkaiser || 1949 PP ||  || August 2, 1949 || Heidelberg || K. Reinmuth || — || align=right | 15 km || 
|-id=184 bgcolor=#E9E9E9
| 3184 Raab || 1949 QC ||  || August 22, 1949 || Johannesburg || E. L. Johnson || slow? || align=right | 19 km || 
|-id=185 bgcolor=#fefefe
| 3185 Clintford ||  ||  || November 11, 1953 || Brooklyn || Indiana University || NYS || align=right | 10 km || 
|-id=186 bgcolor=#d6d6d6
| 3186 Manuilova ||  ||  || September 22, 1973 || Nauchnij || N. S. Chernykh || THM || align=right | 14 km || 
|-id=187 bgcolor=#fefefe
| 3187 Dalian ||  ||  || October 10, 1977 || Nanking || Purple Mountain Obs. || — || align=right | 6.2 km || 
|-id=188 bgcolor=#fefefe
| 3188 Jekabsons || 1978 OM ||  || July 28, 1978 || Bickley || Perth Obs. || — || align=right | 4.3 km || 
|-id=189 bgcolor=#d6d6d6
| 3189 Penza ||  ||  || September 13, 1978 || Nauchnij || N. S. Chernykh || — || align=right | 11 km || 
|-id=190 bgcolor=#d6d6d6
| 3190 Aposhanskij ||  ||  || September 26, 1978 || Nauchnij || L. V. Zhuravleva || EOS || align=right | 9.2 km || 
|-id=191 bgcolor=#d6d6d6
| 3191 Svanetia ||  ||  || September 22, 1979 || Nauchnij || N. S. Chernykh || KOR || align=right | 9.3 km || 
|-id=192 bgcolor=#fefefe
| 3192 A'Hearn ||  ||  || January 30, 1982 || Anderson Mesa || E. Bowell || NYS || align=right | 4.4 km || 
|-id=193 bgcolor=#fefefe
| 3193 Elliot || 1982 DJ ||  || February 20, 1982 || Anderson Mesa || E. Bowell || FLO || align=right | 5.9 km || 
|-id=194 bgcolor=#d6d6d6
| 3194 Dorsey ||  ||  || May 27, 1982 || Palomar || C. S. Shoemaker || EOS || align=right | 14 km || 
|-id=195 bgcolor=#d6d6d6
| 3195 Fedchenko ||  ||  || August 8, 1978 || Nauchnij || N. S. Chernykh || KOR || align=right | 8.6 km || 
|-id=196 bgcolor=#d6d6d6
| 3196 Maklaj || 1978 RY ||  || September 1, 1978 || Nauchnij || N. S. Chernykh || — || align=right | 14 km || 
|-id=197 bgcolor=#E9E9E9
| 3197 Weissman || 1981 AD ||  || January 1, 1981 || Anderson Mesa || E. Bowell || — || align=right | 19 km || 
|-id=198 bgcolor=#FA8072
| 3198 Wallonia ||  ||  || December 30, 1981 || Haute-Provence || F. Dossin || — || align=right | 6.8 km || 
|-id=199 bgcolor=#FFC2E0
| 3199 Nefertiti || 1982 RA ||  || September 13, 1982 || Palomar || C. S. Shoemaker, E. M. Shoemaker || AMO +1km || align=right | 2.2 km || 
|-id=200 bgcolor=#FFC2E0
| 3200 Phaethon || 1983 TB ||  || October 11, 1983 || IRAS || IRAS || APO +1kmPHA || align=right | 6.3 km || 
|}

3201–3300 

|-bgcolor=#fefefe
| 3201 Sijthoff || 6560 P-L ||  || September 24, 1960 || Palomar || PLS || — || align=right | 5.0 km || 
|-id=202 bgcolor=#d6d6d6
| 3202 Graff || A908 AA ||  || January 3, 1908 || Heidelberg || M. F. Wolf || 3:2 || align=right | 36 km || 
|-id=203 bgcolor=#fefefe
| 3203 Huth || 1938 SL ||  || September 18, 1938 || Sonneberg || C. Hoffmeister || — || align=right | 4.3 km || 
|-id=204 bgcolor=#d6d6d6
| 3204 Lindgren || 1978 RH ||  || September 1, 1978 || Nauchnij || N. S. Chernykh || — || align=right | 20 km || 
|-id=205 bgcolor=#E9E9E9
| 3205 Boksenberg ||  ||  || June 25, 1979 || Siding Spring || E. F. Helin, S. J. Bus || ADE || align=right | 12 km || 
|-id=206 bgcolor=#E9E9E9
| 3206 Wuhan ||  ||  || November 13, 1980 || Nanking || Purple Mountain Obs. || — || align=right | 5.4 km || 
|-id=207 bgcolor=#d6d6d6
| 3207 Spinrad ||  ||  || March 2, 1981 || Siding Spring || S. J. Bus || KOR || align=right | 9.4 km || 
|-id=208 bgcolor=#d6d6d6
| 3208 Lunn || 1981 JM ||  || May 3, 1981 || Anderson Mesa || E. Bowell || THM || align=right | 20 km || 
|-id=209 bgcolor=#fefefe
| 3209 Buchwald ||  ||  || January 24, 1982 || Anderson Mesa || E. Bowell || — || align=right | 5.8 km || 
|-id=210 bgcolor=#d6d6d6
| 3210 Lupishko ||  ||  || November 29, 1983 || Anderson Mesa || E. Bowell || — || align=right | 19 km || 
|-id=211 bgcolor=#E9E9E9
| 3211 Louispharailda || 1931 CE ||  || February 10, 1931 || Williams Bay || G. Van Biesbroeck || — || align=right | 8.3 km || 
|-id=212 bgcolor=#fefefe
| 3212 Agricola ||  ||  || February 19, 1938 || Turku || Y. Väisälä || — || align=right | 4.4 km || 
|-id=213 bgcolor=#d6d6d6
| 3213 Smolensk || 1977 NQ ||  || July 14, 1977 || Nauchnij || N. S. Chernykh || THM || align=right | 18 km || 
|-id=214 bgcolor=#d6d6d6
| 3214 Makarenko ||  ||  || October 2, 1978 || Nauchnij || L. V. Zhuravleva || EOS || align=right | 18 km || 
|-id=215 bgcolor=#d6d6d6
| 3215 Lapko || 1980 BQ ||  || January 23, 1980 || Nauchnij || L. G. Karachkina || — || align=right | 20 km || 
|-id=216 bgcolor=#fefefe
| 3216 Harrington || 1980 RB ||  || September 4, 1980 || Anderson Mesa || E. Bowell || — || align=right | 4.0 km || 
|-id=217 bgcolor=#fefefe
| 3217 Seidelmann || 1980 RK ||  || September 2, 1980 || Anderson Mesa || E. Bowell || — || align=right | 3.6 km || 
|-id=218 bgcolor=#E9E9E9
| 3218 Delphine || 6611 P-L ||  || September 24, 1960 || Palomar || PLS || — || align=right | 4.9 km || 
|-id=219 bgcolor=#d6d6d6
| 3219 Komaki || 1934 CX ||  || February 4, 1934 || Heidelberg || K. Reinmuth || — || align=right | 16 km || 
|-id=220 bgcolor=#fefefe
| 3220 Murayama || 1951 WF ||  || November 22, 1951 || Nice || M. Laugier || — || align=right | 4.9 km || 
|-id=221 bgcolor=#fefefe
| 3221 Changshi ||  ||  || December 2, 1981 || Nanking || Purple Mountain Obs. || — || align=right | 6.0 km || 
|-id=222 bgcolor=#d6d6d6
| 3222 Liller || 1983 NJ ||  || July 10, 1983 || Anderson Mesa || E. Bowell || — || align=right | 35 km || 
|-id=223 bgcolor=#E9E9E9
| 3223 Forsius || 1942 RN ||  || September 7, 1942 || Turku || Y. Väisälä || — || align=right | 20 km || 
|-id=224 bgcolor=#E9E9E9
| 3224 Irkutsk ||  ||  || September 11, 1977 || Nauchnij || N. S. Chernykh || — || align=right | 25 km || 
|-id=225 bgcolor=#fefefe
| 3225 Hoag || 1982 QQ ||  || August 20, 1982 || Palomar || C. S. Shoemaker, E. M. Shoemaker || H || align=right | 6.2 km || 
|-id=226 bgcolor=#d6d6d6
| 3226 Plinius || 6565 P-L ||  || September 24, 1960 || Palomar || PLS || KOR || align=right | 7.0 km || 
|-id=227 bgcolor=#fefefe
| 3227 Hasegawa || 1928 DF ||  || February 24, 1928 || Heidelberg || K. Reinmuth || — || align=right | 7.9 km || 
|-id=228 bgcolor=#fefefe
| 3228 Pire || 1935 CL ||  || February 8, 1935 || Uccle || S. Arend || NYS || align=right | 16 km || 
|-id=229 bgcolor=#fefefe
| 3229 Solnhofen || A916 PC ||  || August 9, 1916 || Hamburg-Bergedorf || H. Thiele || — || align=right | 7.1 km || 
|-id=230 bgcolor=#d6d6d6
| 3230 Vampilov || 1972 LE ||  || June 8, 1972 || Nauchnij || N. S. Chernykh || — || align=right | 23 km || 
|-id=231 bgcolor=#fefefe
| 3231 Mila ||  ||  || September 4, 1972 || Nauchnij || L. V. Zhuravleva || — || align=right | 13 km || 
|-id=232 bgcolor=#d6d6d6
| 3232 Brest || 1974 SL ||  || September 19, 1974 || Nauchnij || L. I. Chernykh || EOS || align=right | 17 km || 
|-id=233 bgcolor=#fefefe
| 3233 Krišbarons ||  ||  || September 9, 1977 || Nauchnij || N. S. Chernykh || slow || align=right | 4.1 km || 
|-id=234 bgcolor=#d6d6d6
| 3234 Hergiani ||  ||  || August 31, 1978 || Nauchnij || N. S. Chernykh || — || align=right | 14 km || 
|-id=235 bgcolor=#E9E9E9
| 3235 Melchior ||  ||  || March 6, 1981 || La Silla || H. Debehogne, G. DeSanctis || — || align=right | 9.2 km || 
|-id=236 bgcolor=#fefefe
| 3236 Strand ||  ||  || January 24, 1982 || Anderson Mesa || E. Bowell || — || align=right | 5.0 km || 
|-id=237 bgcolor=#d6d6d6
| 3237 Victorplatt ||  ||  || September 25, 1984 || Palomar || J. Platt || EOS || align=right | 28 km || 
|-id=238 bgcolor=#E9E9E9
| 3238 Timresovia ||  ||  || November 8, 1975 || Nauchnij || N. S. Chernykh || ADE || align=right | 13 km || 
|-id=239 bgcolor=#fefefe
| 3239 Meizhou ||  ||  || October 29, 1978 || Nanking || Purple Mountain Obs. || — || align=right | 3.4 km || 
|-id=240 bgcolor=#C2FFFF
| 3240 Laocoon ||  ||  || November 7, 1978 || Palomar || E. F. Helin, S. J. Bus || L5 || align=right | 52 km || 
|-id=241 bgcolor=#d6d6d6
| 3241 Yeshuhua ||  ||  || November 28, 1978 || Nanking || Purple Mountain Obs. || — || align=right | 17 km || 
|-id=242 bgcolor=#E9E9E9
| 3242 Bakhchisaraj ||  ||  || September 22, 1979 || Nauchnij || N. S. Chernykh || EUN || align=right | 7.7 km || 
|-id=243 bgcolor=#d6d6d6
| 3243 Skytel || 1980 DC ||  || February 19, 1980 || Harvard Observatory || Harvard Obs. || — || align=right | 10 km || 
|-id=244 bgcolor=#fefefe
| 3244 Petronius || 4008 P-L ||  || September 24, 1960 || Palomar || PLS || FLO || align=right | 3.8 km || 
|-id=245 bgcolor=#d6d6d6
| 3245 Jensch ||  ||  || October 27, 1973 || Tautenburg Observatory || F. Börngen || THM || align=right | 13 km || 
|-id=246 bgcolor=#d6d6d6
| 3246 Bidstrup ||  ||  || April 1, 1976 || Nauchnij || N. S. Chernykh || ALA || align=right | 22 km || 
|-id=247 bgcolor=#fefefe
| 3247 Di Martino || 1981 YE ||  || December 30, 1981 || Anderson Mesa || E. Bowell || NYS || align=right | 14 km || 
|-id=248 bgcolor=#d6d6d6
| 3248 Farinella || 1982 FK ||  || March 21, 1982 || Anderson Mesa || E. Bowell || — || align=right | 37 km || 
|-id=249 bgcolor=#fefefe
| 3249 Musashino ||  ||  || February 18, 1977 || Kiso || H. Kosai, K. Furukawa || NYS || align=right | 5.1 km || 
|-id=250 bgcolor=#d6d6d6
| 3250 Martebo || 1979 EB ||  || March 6, 1979 || Mount Stromlo || C.-I. Lagerkvist || EOS || align=right | 19 km || 
|-id=251 bgcolor=#d6d6d6
| 3251 Eratosthenes || 6536 P-L ||  || September 24, 1960 || Palomar || PLS || — || align=right | 15 km || 
|-id=252 bgcolor=#E9E9E9
| 3252 Johnny ||  ||  || March 2, 1981 || Siding Spring || S. J. Bus || EUN || align=right | 7.8 km || 
|-id=253 bgcolor=#fefefe
| 3253 Gradie ||  ||  || April 28, 1982 || Anderson Mesa || E. Bowell || — || align=right | 6.2 km || 
|-id=254 bgcolor=#d6d6d6
| 3254 Bus || 1982 UM ||  || October 17, 1982 || Anderson Mesa || E. Bowell || 3:2 || align=right | 31 km || 
|-id=255 bgcolor=#FA8072
| 3255 Tholen || 1980 RA ||  || September 2, 1980 || Anderson Mesa || E. Bowell || — || align=right | 4.0 km || 
|-id=256 bgcolor=#E9E9E9
| 3256 Daguerre ||  ||  || September 26, 1981 || Anderson Mesa || B. A. Skiff, N. G. Thomas || — || align=right | 21 km || 
|-id=257 bgcolor=#fefefe
| 3257 Hanzlík || 1982 GG ||  || April 15, 1982 || Kleť || A. Mrkos || FLO || align=right | 5.6 km || 
|-id=258 bgcolor=#fefefe
| 3258 Somnium || 1983 RJ ||  || September 8, 1983 || Zimmerwald || P. Wild || — || align=right | 6.5 km || 
|-id=259 bgcolor=#d6d6d6
| 3259 Brownlee ||  ||  || September 25, 1984 || Palomar || J. Platt || — || align=right | 26 km || 
|-id=260 bgcolor=#fefefe
| 3260 Vizbor ||  ||  || September 20, 1974 || Nauchnij || L. V. Zhuravleva || FLO || align=right | 7.7 km || 
|-id=261 bgcolor=#d6d6d6
| 3261 Tvardovskij ||  ||  || September 22, 1979 || Nauchnij || N. S. Chernykh || KOR || align=right | 12 km || 
|-id=262 bgcolor=#d6d6d6
| 3262 Miune || 1983 WB ||  || November 28, 1983 || Geisei || T. Seki || — || align=right | 23 km || 
|-id=263 bgcolor=#fefefe
| 3263 Bligh || 1932 CN ||  || February 5, 1932 || Heidelberg || K. Reinmuth || V || align=right | 4.9 km || 
|-id=264 bgcolor=#d6d6d6
| 3264 Bounty || 1934 AF ||  || January 7, 1934 || Heidelberg || K. Reinmuth || THM || align=right | 16 km || 
|-id=265 bgcolor=#fefefe
| 3265 Fletcher ||  ||  || November 9, 1953 || Heidelberg || K. Reinmuth || V || align=right | 5.9 km || 
|-id=266 bgcolor=#fefefe
| 3266 Bernardus || 1978 PA ||  || August 11, 1978 || La Silla || H.-E. Schuster || H || align=right | 7.6 km || 
|-id=267 bgcolor=#FA8072
| 3267 Glo || 1981 AA ||  || January 3, 1981 || Anderson Mesa || E. Bowell || PHO || align=right | 6.4 km || 
|-id=268 bgcolor=#fefefe
| 3268 De Sanctis || 1981 DD ||  || February 26, 1981 || La Silla || H. Debehogne, G. DeSanctis || V || align=right | 6.0 km || 
|-id=269 bgcolor=#E9E9E9
| 3269 Vibert-Douglas ||  ||  || March 6, 1981 || Siding Spring || S. J. Bus || WAT || align=right | 12 km || 
|-id=270 bgcolor=#FA8072
| 3270 Dudley || 1982 DA ||  || February 18, 1982 || Palomar || C. S. Shoemaker, S. J. Bus || — || align=right | 4.1 km || 
|-id=271 bgcolor=#FFC2E0
| 3271 Ul || 1982 RB ||  || September 14, 1982 || La Silla || H.-E. Schuster || AMO +1km || align=right | 1.7 km || 
|-id=272 bgcolor=#fefefe
| 3272 Tillandz ||  ||  || February 24, 1938 || Turku || Y. Väisälä || FLO || align=right | 5.7 km || 
|-id=273 bgcolor=#d6d6d6
| 3273 Drukar ||  ||  || October 3, 1975 || Nauchnij || L. I. Chernykh || 7:4 || align=right | 27 km || 
|-id=274 bgcolor=#d6d6d6
| 3274 Maillen ||  ||  || August 23, 1981 || La Silla || H. Debehogne || THM || align=right | 15 km || 
|-id=275 bgcolor=#fefefe
| 3275 Oberndorfer ||  ||  || April 25, 1982 || Anderson Mesa || E. Bowell || — || align=right | 11 km || 
|-id=276 bgcolor=#d6d6d6
| 3276 Porta Coeli ||  ||  || September 15, 1982 || Kleť || A. Mrkos || THM || align=right | 18 km || 
|-id=277 bgcolor=#d6d6d6
| 3277 Aaronson ||  ||  || January 8, 1984 || Anderson Mesa || E. Bowell || — || align=right | 20 km || 
|-id=278 bgcolor=#d6d6d6
| 3278 Běhounek || 1984 BT ||  || January 27, 1984 || Kleť || A. Mrkos || — || align=right | 31 km || 
|-id=279 bgcolor=#fefefe
| 3279 Solon || 9103 P-L ||  || October 17, 1960 || Palomar || PLS || FLO || align=right | 5.5 km || 
|-id=280 bgcolor=#E9E9E9
| 3280 Grétry || 1933 SJ ||  || September 17, 1933 || Uccle || F. Rigaux || — || align=right | 8.8 km || 
|-id=281 bgcolor=#fefefe
| 3281 Maupertuis || 1938 DZ ||  || February 24, 1938 || Turku || Y. Väisälä || V || align=right | 5.5 km || 
|-id=282 bgcolor=#fefefe
| 3282 Spencer Jones || 1949 DA ||  || February 19, 1949 || Brooklyn || Indiana University || — || align=right | 5.2 km || 
|-id=283 bgcolor=#fefefe
| 3283 Skorina ||  ||  || August 27, 1979 || Nauchnij || N. S. Chernykh || — || align=right | 11 km || 
|-id=284 bgcolor=#E9E9E9
| 3284 Niebuhr || 1953 NB ||  || July 13, 1953 || Johannesburg || J. A. Bruwer || — || align=right | 9.1 km || 
|-id=285 bgcolor=#E9E9E9
| 3285 Ruth Wolfe ||  ||  || November 5, 1983 || Palomar || C. S. Shoemaker || — || align=right | 8.6 km || 
|-id=286 bgcolor=#E9E9E9
| 3286 Anatoliya || 1980 BV ||  || January 23, 1980 || Nauchnij || L. G. Karachkina || — || align=right | 8.1 km || 
|-id=287 bgcolor=#FA8072
| 3287 Olmstead ||  ||  || February 28, 1981 || Siding Spring || S. J. Bus || — || align=right | 5.5 km || 
|-id=288 bgcolor=#FFC2E0
| 3288 Seleucus || 1982 DV ||  || February 28, 1982 || La Silla || H.-E. Schuster || AMO +1km || align=right | 2.8 km || 
|-id=289 bgcolor=#fefefe
| 3289 Mitani || 1934 RP ||  || September 7, 1934 || Heidelberg || K. Reinmuth || — || align=right | 4.3 km || 
|-id=290 bgcolor=#d6d6d6
| 3290 Azabu ||  ||  || September 19, 1973 || Palomar || PLS || 3:2 || align=right | 10 km || 
|-id=291 bgcolor=#d6d6d6
| 3291 Dunlap ||  ||  || November 14, 1982 || Kiso || H. Kosai, K. Furukawa || — || align=right | 22 km || 
|-id=292 bgcolor=#d6d6d6
| 3292 Sather || 2631 P-L ||  || September 24, 1960 || Palomar || PLS || THM || align=right | 13 km || 
|-id=293 bgcolor=#fefefe
| 3293 Rontaylor || 4650 P-L ||  || September 24, 1960 || Palomar || PLS || NYS || align=right | 4.5 km || 
|-id=294 bgcolor=#E9E9E9
| 3294 Carlvesely || 6563 P-L ||  || September 24, 1960 || Palomar || PLS || — || align=right | 11 km || 
|-id=295 bgcolor=#E9E9E9
| 3295 Murakami || 1950 DH ||  || February 17, 1950 || Heidelberg || K. Reinmuth || — || align=right | 13 km || 
|-id=296 bgcolor=#E9E9E9
| 3296 Bosque Alegre || 1975 SF ||  || September 30, 1975 || El Leoncito || Félix Aguilar Obs. || EUN || align=right | 10 km || 
|-id=297 bgcolor=#d6d6d6
| 3297 Hong Kong ||  ||  || November 26, 1978 || Nanking || Purple Mountain Obs. || THM || align=right | 16 km || 
|-id=298 bgcolor=#fefefe
| 3298 Massandra ||  ||  || July 21, 1979 || Nauchnij || N. S. Chernykh || NYS || align=right | 11 km || 
|-id=299 bgcolor=#fefefe
| 3299 Hall ||  ||  || October 10, 1980 || Palomar || C. S. Shoemaker || — || align=right | 6.1 km || 
|-id=300 bgcolor=#d6d6d6
| 3300 McGlasson || 1928 NA ||  || July 10, 1928 || Johannesburg || H. E. Wood || — || align=right | 23 km || 
|}

3301–3400 

|-bgcolor=#fefefe
| 3301 Jansje || 1978 CT ||  || February 6, 1978 || Bickley || Perth Obs. || FLO || align=right | 5.4 km || 
|-id=302 bgcolor=#fefefe
| 3302 Schliemann ||  ||  || September 11, 1977 || Nauchnij || N. S. Chernykh || — || align=right | 7.5 km || 
|-id=303 bgcolor=#d6d6d6
| 3303 Merta || 1967 UN ||  || October 30, 1967 || Hamburg-Bergedorf || L. Kohoutek || KOR || align=right | 9.9 km || 
|-id=304 bgcolor=#d6d6d6
| 3304 Pearce ||  ||  || March 2, 1981 || Siding Spring || S. J. Bus || — || align=right | 9.3 km || 
|-id=305 bgcolor=#E9E9E9
| 3305 Ceadams || 1985 KB ||  || May 21, 1985 || Lake Tekapo || A. C. Gilmore, P. M. Kilmartin || EUN || align=right | 10 km || 
|-id=306 bgcolor=#fefefe
| 3306 Byron ||  ||  || September 24, 1979 || Nauchnij || N. S. Chernykh || FLO || align=right | 7.6 km || 
|-id=307 bgcolor=#fefefe
| 3307 Athabasca ||  ||  || February 28, 1981 || Siding Spring || S. J. Bus || — || align=right | 3.6 km || 
|-id=308 bgcolor=#d6d6d6
| 3308 Ferreri || 1981 EP ||  || March 1, 1981 || La Silla || H. Debehogne, G. DeSanctis || — || align=right | 12 km || 
|-id=309 bgcolor=#fefefe
| 3309 Brorfelde || 1982 BH ||  || January 28, 1982 || Brorfelde || K. S. Jensen || Hmoon || align=right | 5.0 km || 
|-id=310 bgcolor=#d6d6d6
| 3310 Patsy ||  ||  || October 9, 1931 || Flagstaff || C. W. Tombaugh || EOS || align=right | 24 km || 
|-id=311 bgcolor=#E9E9E9
| 3311 Podobed ||  ||  || August 26, 1976 || Nauchnij || N. S. Chernykh || — || align=right | 17 km || 
|-id=312 bgcolor=#d6d6d6
| 3312 Pedersen || 1984 SN ||  || September 24, 1984 || Brorfelde || Copenhagen Obs. || EOS || align=right | 17 km || 
|-id=313 bgcolor=#E9E9E9
| 3313 Mendel || 1980 DG ||  || February 19, 1980 || Kleť || A. Mrkos || — || align=right | 8.8 km || 
|-id=314 bgcolor=#fefefe
| 3314 Beals || 1981 FH ||  || March 30, 1981 || Anderson Mesa || E. Bowell || — || align=right | 6.8 km || 
|-id=315 bgcolor=#E9E9E9
| 3315 Chant || 1984 CZ ||  || February 8, 1984 || Anderson Mesa || E. Bowell || — || align=right | 9.5 km || 
|-id=316 bgcolor=#d6d6d6
| 3316 Herzberg ||  ||  || February 6, 1984 || Anderson Mesa || E. Bowell || — || align=right | 17 km || 
|-id=317 bgcolor=#C2FFFF
| 3317 Paris || 1984 KF ||  || May 26, 1984 || Palomar || C. S. Shoemaker, E. M. Shoemaker || L5 || align=right | 119 km || 
|-id=318 bgcolor=#d6d6d6
| 3318 Blixen || 1985 HB ||  || April 23, 1985 || Brorfelde || K. Augustesen, P. Jensen || EOS || align=right | 23 km || 
|-id=319 bgcolor=#d6d6d6
| 3319 Kibi ||  ||  || March 12, 1977 || Kiso || H. Kosai, K. Furukawa || HYG || align=right | 19 km || 
|-id=320 bgcolor=#fefefe
| 3320 Namba ||  ||  || November 14, 1982 || Kiso || H. Kosai, K. Furukawa || — || align=right | 6.7 km || 
|-id=321 bgcolor=#E9E9E9
| 3321 Dasha ||  ||  || October 3, 1975 || Nauchnij || L. I. Chernykh || — || align=right | 8.0 km || 
|-id=322 bgcolor=#fefefe
| 3322 Lidiya ||  ||  || December 1, 1975 || Nauchnij || T. M. Smirnova || PHOslow? || align=right | 6.4 km || 
|-id=323 bgcolor=#E9E9E9
| 3323 Turgenev ||  ||  || September 22, 1979 || Nauchnij || N. S. Chernykh || — || align=right | 4.8 km || 
|-id=324 bgcolor=#E9E9E9
| 3324 Avsyuk ||  ||  || February 4, 1983 || Kleť || A. Mrkos || AER || align=right | 19 km || 
|-id=325 bgcolor=#d6d6d6
| 3325 TARDIS || 1984 JZ ||  || May 3, 1984 || Anderson Mesa || B. A. Skiff || ALA || align=right | 28 km || 
|-id=326 bgcolor=#fefefe
| 3326 Agafonikov || 1985 FL ||  || March 20, 1985 || Kleť || A. Mrkos || — || align=right | 14 km || 
|-id=327 bgcolor=#d6d6d6
| 3327 Campins || 1985 PW ||  || August 14, 1985 || Anderson Mesa || E. Bowell || — || align=right | 21 km || 
|-id=328 bgcolor=#d6d6d6
| 3328 Interposita ||  ||  || August 21, 1985 || Zimmerwald || T. Schildknecht || EOS || align=right | 18 km || 
|-id=329 bgcolor=#d6d6d6
| 3329 Golay ||  ||  || September 12, 1985 || Zimmerwald || P. Wild || EOS || align=right | 18 km || 
|-id=330 bgcolor=#d6d6d6
| 3330 Gantrisch ||  ||  || September 12, 1985 || Zimmerwald || T. Schildknecht || LIX || align=right | 35 km || 
|-id=331 bgcolor=#fefefe
| 3331 Kvistaberg || 1979 QS ||  || August 22, 1979 || La Silla || C.-I. Lagerkvist || — || align=right | 6.0 km || 
|-id=332 bgcolor=#E9E9E9
| 3332 Raksha ||  ||  || July 4, 1978 || Nauchnij || L. I. Chernykh || — || align=right | 15 km || 
|-id=333 bgcolor=#d6d6d6
| 3333 Schaber ||  ||  || October 9, 1980 || Palomar || C. S. Shoemaker || — || align=right | 27 km || 
|-id=334 bgcolor=#d6d6d6
| 3334 Somov || 1981 YR ||  || December 20, 1981 || Kleť || A. Mrkos || KOR || align=right | 15 km || 
|-id=335 bgcolor=#E9E9E9
| 3335 Quanzhou || 1966 AA ||  || January 1, 1966 || Nanking || Purple Mountain Obs. || — || align=right | 10 km || 
|-id=336 bgcolor=#fefefe
| 3336 Grygar || 1971 UX ||  || October 26, 1971 || Hamburg-Bergedorf || L. Kohoutek || — || align=right | 3.6 km || 
|-id=337 bgcolor=#d6d6d6
| 3337 Miloš ||  ||  || October 26, 1971 || Hamburg-Bergedorf || L. Kohoutek || KOR || align=right | 11 km || 
|-id=338 bgcolor=#fefefe
| 3338 Richter ||  ||  || October 28, 1973 || Tautenburg Observatory || F. Börngen || — || align=right | 3.6 km || 
|-id=339 bgcolor=#d6d6d6
| 3339 Treshnikov || 1978 LB ||  || June 6, 1978 || Kleť || A. Mrkos || — || align=right | 34 km || 
|-id=340 bgcolor=#fefefe
| 3340 Yinhai || 1979 TK ||  || October 12, 1979 || Nanking || Purple Mountain Obs. || FLO || align=right | 4.9 km || 
|-id=341 bgcolor=#d6d6d6
| 3341 Hartmann || 1980 OD ||  || July 17, 1980 || Anderson Mesa || E. Bowell || — || align=right | 12 km || 
|-id=342 bgcolor=#d6d6d6
| 3342 Fivesparks ||  ||  || January 27, 1982 || Harvard Observatory || Oak Ridge Observatory || — || align=right | 22 km || 
|-id=343 bgcolor=#FA8072
| 3343 Nedzel || 1982 HS ||  || April 28, 1982 || Socorro || Lincoln Lab ETS || — || align=right | 5.2 km || 
|-id=344 bgcolor=#fefefe
| 3344 Modena || 1982 JA ||  || May 15, 1982 || Bologna || San Vittore Obs. || — || align=right | 7.4 km || 
|-id=345 bgcolor=#fefefe
| 3345 Tarkovskij ||  ||  || December 23, 1982 || Nauchnij || L. G. Karachkina || slow || align=right | 22 km || 
|-id=346 bgcolor=#d6d6d6
| 3346 Gerla || 1951 SD ||  || September 27, 1951 || Uccle || S. Arend || ALA || align=right | 35 km || 
|-id=347 bgcolor=#d6d6d6
| 3347 Konstantin ||  ||  || November 2, 1975 || Nauchnij || T. M. Smirnova || — || align=right | 17 km || 
|-id=348 bgcolor=#d6d6d6
| 3348 Pokryshkin ||  ||  || March 6, 1978 || Nauchnij || N. S. Chernykh || — || align=right | 16 km || 
|-id=349 bgcolor=#E9E9E9
| 3349 Manas ||  ||  || March 23, 1979 || Nauchnij || N. S. Chernykh || — || align=right | 10 km || 
|-id=350 bgcolor=#fefefe
| 3350 Scobee || 1980 PJ ||  || August 8, 1980 || Anderson Mesa || E. Bowell || — || align=right | 7.4 km || 
|-id=351 bgcolor=#d6d6d6
| 3351 Smith ||  ||  || September 7, 1980 || Anderson Mesa || E. Bowell || — || align=right | 7.3 km || 
|-id=352 bgcolor=#FFC2E0
| 3352 McAuliffe || 1981 CW ||  || February 6, 1981 || Anderson Mesa || N. G. Thomas || AMO +1km || align=right | 2.4 km || 
|-id=353 bgcolor=#fefefe
| 3353 Jarvis || 1981 YC ||  || December 20, 1981 || Anderson Mesa || E. Bowell || Hslow || align=right | 11 km || 
|-id=354 bgcolor=#fefefe
| 3354 McNair || 1984 CW ||  || February 8, 1984 || Anderson Mesa || E. Bowell || — || align=right | 7.7 km || 
|-id=355 bgcolor=#fefefe
| 3355 Onizuka ||  ||  || February 8, 1984 || Anderson Mesa || E. Bowell || FLO || align=right | 4.7 km || 
|-id=356 bgcolor=#fefefe
| 3356 Resnik || 1984 EU ||  || March 6, 1984 || Anderson Mesa || E. Bowell || — || align=right | 4.8 km || 
|-id=357 bgcolor=#d6d6d6
| 3357 Tolstikov || 1984 FT ||  || March 21, 1984 || Kleť || A. Mrkos || EOS || align=right | 16 km || 
|-id=358 bgcolor=#d6d6d6
| 3358 Anikushin || 1978 RX ||  || September 1, 1978 || Nauchnij || N. S. Chernykh || THM || align=right | 14 km || 
|-id=359 bgcolor=#fefefe
| 3359 Purcari ||  ||  || September 13, 1978 || Nauchnij || N. S. Chernykh || FLO || align=right | 4.2 km || 
|-id=360 bgcolor=#FFC2E0
| 3360 Syrinx || 1981 VA ||  || November 4, 1981 || Palomar || E. F. Helin, R. S. Dunbar || APO +1km || align=right | 1.8 km || 
|-id=361 bgcolor=#FFC2E0
| 3361 Orpheus || 1982 HR ||  || April 24, 1982 || Cerro El Roble || C. Torres || APOPHA || align=right data-sort-value="0.3" | 300 m || 
|-id=362 bgcolor=#FFC2E0
| 3362 Khufu || 1984 QA ||  || August 30, 1984 || Palomar || R. S. Dunbar, M. A. Barucci || ATEPHAcritical || align=right data-sort-value="0.7" | 700 m || 
|-id=363 bgcolor=#E9E9E9
| 3363 Bowen || 1960 EE ||  || March 6, 1960 || Brooklyn || Indiana University || — || align=right | 9.4 km || 
|-id=364 bgcolor=#fefefe
| 3364 Zdenka || 1984 GF ||  || April 5, 1984 || Kleť || A. Mrkos || — || align=right | 5.4 km || 
|-id=365 bgcolor=#E9E9E9
| 3365 Recogne ||  ||  || February 13, 1985 || La Silla || H. Debehogne || — || align=right | 18 km || 
|-id=366 bgcolor=#d6d6d6
| 3366 Gödel ||  ||  || September 22, 1985 || Zimmerwald || T. Schildknecht || EOS || align=right | 17 km || 
|-id=367 bgcolor=#E9E9E9
| 3367 Alex ||  ||  || February 15, 1983 || Anderson Mesa || N. G. Thomas || — || align=right | 9.6 km || 
|-id=368 bgcolor=#d6d6d6
| 3368 Duncombe || 1985 QT ||  || August 22, 1985 || Anderson Mesa || E. Bowell || 7:4 || align=right | 33 km || 
|-id=369 bgcolor=#d6d6d6
| 3369 Freuchen || 1985 UZ ||  || October 18, 1985 || Brorfelde || Copenhagen Obs. || EMA || align=right | 24 km || 
|-id=370 bgcolor=#fefefe
| 3370 Kohsai || 1934 CU ||  || February 4, 1934 || Heidelberg || K. Reinmuth || — || align=right | 5.4 km || 
|-id=371 bgcolor=#E9E9E9
| 3371 Giacconi || 1955 RZ ||  || September 14, 1955 || Brooklyn || Indiana University || — || align=right | 11 km || 
|-id=372 bgcolor=#E9E9E9
| 3372 Bratijchuk ||  ||  || September 24, 1976 || Nauchnij || N. S. Chernykh || — || align=right | 21 km || 
|-id=373 bgcolor=#fefefe
| 3373 Koktebelia ||  ||  || August 31, 1978 || Nauchnij || N. S. Chernykh || — || align=right | 4.4 km || 
|-id=374 bgcolor=#d6d6d6
| 3374 Namur || 1980 KO ||  || May 22, 1980 || La Silla || H. Debehogne || KOR || align=right | 7.8 km || 
|-id=375 bgcolor=#fefefe
| 3375 Amy ||  ||  || May 5, 1981 || Palomar || C. S. Shoemaker || — || align=right | 6.7 km || 
|-id=376 bgcolor=#fefefe
| 3376 Armandhammer ||  ||  || October 21, 1982 || Nauchnij || L. V. Zhuravleva || V || align=right | 7.9 km || 
|-id=377 bgcolor=#d6d6d6
| 3377 Lodewijk || 4122 P-L ||  || September 24, 1960 || Palomar || PLS || KOR || align=right | 7.7 km || 
|-id=378 bgcolor=#fefefe
| 3378 Susanvictoria || A922 WB ||  || November 25, 1922 || Williams Bay || G. Van Biesbroeck || moon || align=right | 6.6 km || 
|-id=379 bgcolor=#fefefe
| 3379 Oishi ||  ||  || October 6, 1931 || Heidelberg || K. Reinmuth || NYS || align=right | 13 km || 
|-id=380 bgcolor=#d6d6d6
| 3380 Awaji || 1940 EF ||  || March 15, 1940 || Konkoly || G. Kulin || KOR || align=right | 12 km || 
|-id=381 bgcolor=#fefefe
| 3381 Mikkola || 1941 UG ||  || October 15, 1941 || Turku || L. Oterma || — || align=right | 3.8 km || 
|-id=382 bgcolor=#fefefe
| 3382 Cassidy || 1948 RD ||  || September 7, 1948 || Flagstaff || H. L. Giclas || FLO || align=right | 6.4 km || 
|-id=383 bgcolor=#E9E9E9
| 3383 Koyama || 1951 AB ||  || January 9, 1951 || Heidelberg || K. Reinmuth || slow || align=right | 11 km || 
|-id=384 bgcolor=#fefefe
| 3384 Daliya ||  ||  || September 19, 1974 || Nauchnij || L. I. Chernykh || NYS || align=right | 4.2 km || 
|-id=385 bgcolor=#fefefe
| 3385 Bronnina ||  ||  || September 24, 1979 || Nauchnij || N. S. Chernykh || — || align=right | 7.7 km || 
|-id=386 bgcolor=#d6d6d6
| 3386 Klementinum || 1980 FA ||  || March 16, 1980 || Kleť || L. Brožek || KOR || align=right | 8.6 km || 
|-id=387 bgcolor=#E9E9E9
| 3387 Greenberg || 1981 WE ||  || November 20, 1981 || Anderson Mesa || E. Bowell || EUN || align=right | 8.1 km || 
|-id=388 bgcolor=#fefefe
| 3388 Tsanghinchi ||  ||  || December 21, 1981 || Nanking || Purple Mountain Obs. || PHO || align=right | 6.3 km || 
|-id=389 bgcolor=#E9E9E9
| 3389 Sinzot || 1984 DU ||  || February 25, 1984 || La Silla || H. Debehogne || — || align=right | 21 km || 
|-id=390 bgcolor=#fefefe
| 3390 Demanet ||  ||  || March 2, 1984 || La Silla || H. Debehogne || FLOmoon || align=right | 5.1 km || 
|-id=391 bgcolor=#C2FFFF
| 3391 Sinon ||  ||  || February 18, 1977 || Kiso || H. Kosai, K. Furukawa || L4 || align=right | 38 km || 
|-id=392 bgcolor=#FA8072
| 3392 Setouchi || 1979 YB ||  || December 17, 1979 || Kiso || H. Kosai, G. Sasaki || — || align=right | 5.0 km || 
|-id=393 bgcolor=#E9E9E9
| 3393 Štúr ||  ||  || November 28, 1984 || Piszkéstető || M. Antal || — || align=right | 9.6 km || 
|-id=394 bgcolor=#fefefe
| 3394 Banno || 1986 DB ||  || February 16, 1986 || Karasuyama || S. Inoda || — || align=right | 6.3 km || 
|-id=395 bgcolor=#E9E9E9
| 3395 Jitka || 1985 UN ||  || October 20, 1985 || Kleť || A. Mrkos || — || align=right | 11 km || 
|-id=396 bgcolor=#d6d6d6
| 3396 Muazzez || A915 TE ||  || October 15, 1915 || Heidelberg || M. F. Wolf || 7:4 || align=right | 33 km || 
|-id=397 bgcolor=#FA8072
| 3397 Leyla || 1964 XA ||  || December 8, 1964 || Flagstaff || R. Burnham, N. G. Thomas || PHO || align=right | 5.3 km || 
|-id=398 bgcolor=#fefefe
| 3398 Stättmayer || 1978 PC ||  || August 10, 1978 || La Silla || H.-E. Schuster || PHO || align=right | 5.7 km || 
|-id=399 bgcolor=#d6d6d6
| 3399 Kobzon ||  ||  || September 22, 1979 || Nauchnij || N. S. Chernykh || THM || align=right | 17 km || 
|-id=400 bgcolor=#fefefe
| 3400 Aotearoa || 1981 GX ||  || April 2, 1981 || Lake Tekapo || A. C. Gilmore, P. M. Kilmartin || H || align=right | 2.0 km || 
|}

3401–3500 

|-bgcolor=#FA8072
| 3401 Vanphilos || 1981 PA ||  || August 1, 1981 || Harvard Observatory || Harvard Obs. || — || align=right | 7.0 km || 
|-id=402 bgcolor=#FA8072
| 3402 Wisdom || 1981 PB ||  || August 5, 1981 || Anderson Mesa || E. Bowell || — || align=right | 2.1 km || 
|-id=403 bgcolor=#fefefe
| 3403 Tammy || 1981 SW ||  || September 25, 1981 || Socorro || L. G. Taff || — || align=right | 4.1 km || 
|-id=404 bgcolor=#E9E9E9
| 3404 Hinderer || 1934 CY ||  || February 4, 1934 || Heidelberg || K. Reinmuth || — || align=right | 8.4 km || 
|-id=405 bgcolor=#E9E9E9
| 3405 Daiwensai || 1964 UQ ||  || October 30, 1964 || Nanking || Purple Mountain Obs. || — || align=right | 25 km || 
|-id=406 bgcolor=#E9E9E9
| 3406 Omsk || 1969 DA ||  || February 21, 1969 || Nauchnij || B. A. Burnasheva || — || align=right | 16 km || 
|-id=407 bgcolor=#E9E9E9
| 3407 Jimmysimms || 1973 DT ||  || February 28, 1973 || Hamburg-Bergedorf || L. Kohoutek || ADE || align=right | 16 km || 
|-id=408 bgcolor=#fefefe
| 3408 Shalamov ||  ||  || August 18, 1977 || Nauchnij || N. S. Chernykh || NYS || align=right | 5.8 km || 
|-id=409 bgcolor=#d6d6d6
| 3409 Abramov ||  ||  || September 9, 1977 || Nauchnij || N. S. Chernykh || KOR || align=right | 11 km || 
|-id=410 bgcolor=#fefefe
| 3410 Vereshchagin ||  ||  || September 26, 1978 || Nauchnij || L. V. Zhuravleva || FLO || align=right | 4.4 km || 
|-id=411 bgcolor=#fefefe
| 3411 Debetencourt || 1980 LK ||  || June 2, 1980 || La Silla || H. Debehogne || FLO || align=right | 5.5 km || 
|-id=412 bgcolor=#fefefe
| 3412 Kafka ||  ||  || January 10, 1983 || Palomar || R. Kirk, D. Rudy || — || align=right | 6.1 km || 
|-id=413 bgcolor=#fefefe
| 3413 Andriana ||  ||  || February 15, 1983 || Anderson Mesa || N. G. Thomas || FLO || align=right | 5.5 km || 
|-id=414 bgcolor=#fefefe
| 3414 Champollion || 1983 DJ ||  || February 19, 1983 || Anderson Mesa || E. Bowell || FLO || align=right | 5.2 km || 
|-id=415 bgcolor=#d6d6d6
| 3415 Danby || 1928 SL ||  || September 22, 1928 || Heidelberg || K. Reinmuth || 3:2 || align=right | 37 km || 
|-id=416 bgcolor=#FA8072
| 3416 Dorrit || 1931 VP ||  || November 8, 1931 || Heidelberg || K. Reinmuth || H || align=right | 6.1 km || 
|-id=417 bgcolor=#fefefe
| 3417 Tamblyn || 1937 GG ||  || April 1, 1937 || Heidelberg || K. Reinmuth || — || align=right | 4.6 km || 
|-id=418 bgcolor=#d6d6d6
| 3418 Izvekov ||  ||  || August 31, 1973 || Nauchnij || T. M. Smirnova || — || align=right | 19 km || 
|-id=419 bgcolor=#d6d6d6
| 3419 Guth || 1981 JZ ||  || May 8, 1981 || Kleť || L. Brožek || URS || align=right | 35 km || 
|-id=420 bgcolor=#d6d6d6
| 3420 Standish || 1984 EB ||  || March 1, 1984 || Anderson Mesa || E. Bowell || — || align=right | 19 km || 
|-id=421 bgcolor=#fefefe
| 3421 Yangchenning ||  ||  || November 26, 1975 || Nanking || Purple Mountain Obs. || — || align=right | 4.0 km || 
|-id=422 bgcolor=#E9E9E9
| 3422 Reid || 1978 OJ ||  || July 28, 1978 || Bickley || Perth Obs. || — || align=right | 15 km || 
|-id=423 bgcolor=#d6d6d6
| 3423 Slouka || 1981 CK ||  || February 9, 1981 || Kleť || L. Brožek || THM || align=right | 16 km || 
|-id=424 bgcolor=#E9E9E9
| 3424 Nušl || 1982 CD ||  || February 14, 1982 || Kleť || L. Brožek || — || align=right | 6.8 km || 
|-id=425 bgcolor=#d6d6d6
| 3425 Hurukawa || 1929 BD ||  || January 29, 1929 || Heidelberg || K. Reinmuth || EOS || align=right | 21 km || 
|-id=426 bgcolor=#E9E9E9
| 3426 Seki || 1932 CQ ||  || February 5, 1932 || Heidelberg || K. Reinmuth || — || align=right | 16 km || 
|-id=427 bgcolor=#fefefe
| 3427 Szentmártoni || 1938 AD ||  || January 6, 1938 || Konkoly || G. Kulin || — || align=right | 5.0 km || 
|-id=428 bgcolor=#E9E9E9
| 3428 Roberts || 1952 JH ||  || May 1, 1952 || Brooklyn || Indiana University || — || align=right | 17 km || 
|-id=429 bgcolor=#fefefe
| 3429 Chuvaev ||  ||  || September 19, 1974 || Nauchnij || L. I. Chernykh || — || align=right | 8.9 km || 
|-id=430 bgcolor=#E9E9E9
| 3430 Bradfield ||  ||  || October 9, 1980 || Palomar || C. S. Shoemaker || AGN || align=right | 8.5 km || 
|-id=431 bgcolor=#d6d6d6
| 3431 Nakano || 1984 QC ||  || August 24, 1984 || Geisei || T. Seki || — || align=right | 44 km || 
|-id=432 bgcolor=#d6d6d6
| 3432 Kobuchizawa || 1986 EE ||  || March 7, 1986 || Kobuchizawa || M. Inoue, O. Muramatsu, T. Urata || THB || align=right | 17 km || 
|-id=433 bgcolor=#fefefe
| 3433 Fehrenbach ||  ||  || October 15, 1963 || Brooklyn || Indiana University || moon || align=right | 7.7 km || 
|-id=434 bgcolor=#E9E9E9
| 3434 Hurless || 1981 VO ||  || November 2, 1981 || Anderson Mesa || B. A. Skiff || MIS || align=right | 14 km || 
|-id=435 bgcolor=#fefefe
| 3435 Boury ||  ||  || December 2, 1981 || Haute-Provence || F. Dossin || — || align=right | 7.3 km || 
|-id=436 bgcolor=#d6d6d6
| 3436 Ibadinov ||  ||  || September 24, 1976 || Nauchnij || N. S. Chernykh || KORslow? || align=right | 8.0 km || 
|-id=437 bgcolor=#fefefe
| 3437 Kapitsa ||  ||  || October 20, 1982 || Nauchnij || L. G. Karachkina || FLO || align=right | 5.8 km || 
|-id=438 bgcolor=#d6d6d6
| 3438 Inarradas ||  ||  || September 21, 1974 || El Leoncito || Félix Aguilar Obs. || INA || align=right | 25 km || 
|-id=439 bgcolor=#E9E9E9
| 3439 Lebofsky ||  ||  || September 4, 1983 || Anderson Mesa || E. Bowell || MRX || align=right | 8.8 km || 
|-id=440 bgcolor=#E9E9E9
| 3440 Stampfer || 1950 DD ||  || February 17, 1950 || Heidelberg || K. Reinmuth || — || align=right | 11 km || 
|-id=441 bgcolor=#d6d6d6
| 3441 Pochaina ||  ||  || October 8, 1969 || Nauchnij || L. I. Chernykh || THM || align=right | 18 km || 
|-id=442 bgcolor=#d6d6d6
| 3442 Yashin ||  ||  || October 2, 1978 || Nauchnij || L. V. Zhuravleva || — || align=right | 26 km || 
|-id=443 bgcolor=#FA8072
| 3443 Leetsungdao ||  ||  || September 26, 1979 || Nanking || Purple Mountain Obs. || — || align=right | 8.9 km || 
|-id=444 bgcolor=#E9E9E9
| 3444 Stepanian ||  ||  || September 7, 1980 || Nauchnij || N. S. Chernykh || — || align=right | 6.4 km || 
|-id=445 bgcolor=#E9E9E9
| 3445 Pinson || 1983 FC ||  || March 16, 1983 || Anderson Mesa || E. Barr || ADE || align=right | 20 km || 
|-id=446 bgcolor=#fefefe
| 3446 Combes || 1942 EB ||  || March 12, 1942 || Heidelberg || K. Reinmuth || — || align=right | 8.4 km || 
|-id=447 bgcolor=#fefefe
| 3447 Burckhalter || 1956 SC ||  || September 29, 1956 || Brooklyn || Indiana University || H || align=right | 6.0 km || 
|-id=448 bgcolor=#fefefe
| 3448 Narbut ||  ||  || August 22, 1977 || Nauchnij || N. S. Chernykh || slow || align=right | 6.0 km || 
|-id=449 bgcolor=#d6d6d6
| 3449 Abell ||  ||  || November 7, 1978 || Palomar || E. F. Helin, S. J. Bus || THM || align=right | 16 km || 
|-id=450 bgcolor=#E9E9E9
| 3450 Dommanget || 1983 QJ ||  || August 31, 1983 || La Silla || H. Debehogne || PAD || align=right | 17 km || 
|-id=451 bgcolor=#C2FFFF
| 3451 Mentor ||  ||  || April 19, 1984 || Kleť || A. Mrkos || L5 || align=right | 126 km || 
|-id=452 bgcolor=#fefefe
| 3452 Hawke || 1980 OA ||  || July 17, 1980 || Anderson Mesa || E. Bowell || — || align=right | 3.5 km || 
|-id=453 bgcolor=#fefefe
| 3453 Dostoevsky ||  ||  || September 27, 1981 || Nauchnij || L. G. Karachkina || — || align=right | 5.7 km || 
|-id=454 bgcolor=#fefefe
| 3454 Lieske ||  ||  || November 24, 1981 || Anderson Mesa || E. Bowell || FLOslow? || align=right | 5.6 km || 
|-id=455 bgcolor=#fefefe
| 3455 Kristensen || 1985 QC ||  || August 20, 1985 || Anderson Mesa || E. Bowell || — || align=right | 5.9 km || 
|-id=456 bgcolor=#fefefe
| 3456 Etiennemarey ||  ||  || September 5, 1985 || La Silla || H. Debehogne || — || align=right | 4.3 km || 
|-id=457 bgcolor=#d6d6d6
| 3457 Arnenordheim ||  ||  || September 5, 1985 || La Silla || H. Debehogne || KOR || align=right | 13 km || 
|-id=458 bgcolor=#fefefe
| 3458 Boduognat ||  ||  || September 7, 1985 || La Silla || H. Debehogne || — || align=right | 7.4 km || 
|-id=459 bgcolor=#fefefe
| 3459 Bodil || 1986 GB ||  || April 2, 1986 || Brorfelde || P. Jensen || FLO || align=right | 7.9 km || 
|-id=460 bgcolor=#d6d6d6
| 3460 Ashkova ||  ||  || August 31, 1973 || Nauchnij || T. M. Smirnova || — || align=right | 18 km || 
|-id=461 bgcolor=#fefefe
| 3461 Mandelshtam ||  ||  || September 18, 1977 || Nauchnij || N. S. Chernykh || — || align=right | 7.6 km || 
|-id=462 bgcolor=#fefefe
| 3462 Zhouguangzhao ||  ||  || October 25, 1981 || Nanking || Purple Mountain Obs. || — || align=right | 5.6 km || 
|-id=463 bgcolor=#fefefe
| 3463 Kaokuen ||  ||  || December 3, 1981 || Nanking || Purple Mountain Obs. || NYS || align=right | 14 km || 
|-id=464 bgcolor=#fefefe
| 3464 Owensby || 1983 BA ||  || January 16, 1983 || Anderson Mesa || E. Bowell || — || align=right | 4.4 km || 
|-id=465 bgcolor=#fefefe
| 3465 Trevires ||  ||  || September 20, 1984 || La Silla || H. Debehogne || — || align=right | 5.9 km || 
|-id=466 bgcolor=#fefefe
| 3466 Ritina ||  ||  || March 6, 1975 || Nauchnij || N. S. Chernykh || EUT || align=right | 5.8 km || 
|-id=467 bgcolor=#fefefe
| 3467 Bernheim ||  ||  || September 26, 1981 || Anderson Mesa || N. G. Thomas || NYS || align=right | 12 km || 
|-id=468 bgcolor=#d6d6d6
| 3468 Urgenta || 1975 AM ||  || January 7, 1975 || Zimmerwald || P. Wild || EOS || align=right | 14 km || 
|-id=469 bgcolor=#d6d6d6
| 3469 Bulgakov ||  ||  || October 21, 1982 || Nauchnij || L. G. Karachkina || EOS || align=right | 19 km || 
|-id=470 bgcolor=#fefefe
| 3470 Yaronika || 1975 ES ||  || March 6, 1975 || Nauchnij || N. S. Chernykh || — || align=right | 13 km || 
|-id=471 bgcolor=#d6d6d6
| 3471 Amelin ||  ||  || August 21, 1977 || Nauchnij || N. S. Chernykh || URS || align=right | 29 km || 
|-id=472 bgcolor=#E9E9E9
| 3472 Upgren ||  ||  || March 1, 1981 || Siding Spring || S. J. Bus || — || align=right | 11 km || 
|-id=473 bgcolor=#fefefe
| 3473 Sapporo || A924 EG ||  || March 7, 1924 || Heidelberg || K. Reinmuth || EUT || align=right | 4.8 km || 
|-id=474 bgcolor=#E9E9E9
| 3474 Linsley || 1962 HE ||  || April 27, 1962 || Brooklyn || Indiana University || — || align=right | 8.1 km || 
|-id=475 bgcolor=#d6d6d6
| 3475 Fichte || 1972 TD ||  || October 4, 1972 || Hamburg-Bergedorf || L. Kohoutek || — || align=right | 30 km || 
|-id=476 bgcolor=#d6d6d6
| 3476 Dongguan ||  ||  || October 28, 1978 || Nanking || Purple Mountain Obs. || — || align=right | 32 km || 
|-id=477 bgcolor=#fefefe
| 3477 Kazbegi || 1979 KH ||  || May 19, 1979 || La Silla || R. M. West || V || align=right | 6.2 km || 
|-id=478 bgcolor=#fefefe
| 3478 Fanale || 1979 XG ||  || December 14, 1979 || Anderson Mesa || E. Bowell || — || align=right | 7.0 km || 
|-id=479 bgcolor=#d6d6d6
| 3479 Malaparte || 1980 TQ ||  || October 3, 1980 || Kleť || Z. Vávrová || — || align=right | 19 km || 
|-id=480 bgcolor=#d6d6d6
| 3480 Abante || 1981 GB ||  || April 1, 1981 || Anderson Mesa || E. Bowell || — || align=right | 9.5 km || 
|-id=481 bgcolor=#fefefe
| 3481 Xianglupeak ||  ||  || February 19, 1982 || Xinglong || Peking Obs. || FLO || align=right | 6.0 km || 
|-id=482 bgcolor=#E9E9E9
| 3482 Lesnaya ||  ||  || November 2, 1975 || Nauchnij || T. M. Smirnova || — || align=right | 13 km || 
|-id=483 bgcolor=#fefefe
| 3483 Svetlov ||  ||  || December 16, 1976 || Nauchnij || L. I. Chernykh || H || align=right | 2.9 km || 
|-id=484 bgcolor=#E9E9E9
| 3484 Neugebauer || 1978 NE ||  || July 10, 1978 || Palomar || E. F. Helin, E. M. Shoemaker || — || align=right | 6.9 km || 
|-id=485 bgcolor=#fefefe
| 3485 Barucci || 1983 NU ||  || July 11, 1983 || Anderson Mesa || E. Bowell || NYS || align=right | 15 km || 
|-id=486 bgcolor=#fefefe
| 3486 Fulchignoni || 1984 CR ||  || February 5, 1984 || Anderson Mesa || E. Bowell || NYS || align=right | 5.8 km || 
|-id=487 bgcolor=#E9E9E9
| 3487 Edgeworth || 1978 UF ||  || October 28, 1978 || Anderson Mesa || H. L. Giclas || EUN || align=right | 8.3 km || 
|-id=488 bgcolor=#E9E9E9
| 3488 Brahic || 1980 PM ||  || August 8, 1980 || Anderson Mesa || E. Bowell || EUN || align=right | 5.3 km || 
|-id=489 bgcolor=#fefefe
| 3489 Lottie ||  ||  || January 10, 1983 || Palomar || K. Herkenhoff, G. Ojakangas || V || align=right | 4.4 km || 
|-id=490 bgcolor=#fefefe
| 3490 Šolc || 1984 SV ||  || September 20, 1984 || Kleť || A. Mrkos || V || align=right | 5.0 km || 
|-id=491 bgcolor=#E9E9E9
| 3491 Fridolin ||  ||  || September 30, 1984 || Zimmerwald || P. Wild || AGN || align=right | 8.0 km || 
|-id=492 bgcolor=#E9E9E9
| 3492 Petra-Pepi || 1985 DQ ||  || February 16, 1985 || Kleť || M. Mahrová || EUN || align=right | 12 km || 
|-id=493 bgcolor=#fefefe
| 3493 Stepanov ||  ||  || April 3, 1976 || Nauchnij || N. S. Chernykh || FLO || align=right | 6.3 km || 
|-id=494 bgcolor=#fefefe
| 3494 Purple Mountain || 1980 XW ||  || December 7, 1980 || Nanking || Purple Mountain Obs. || V || align=right | 6.5 km || 
|-id=495 bgcolor=#d6d6d6
| 3495 Colchagua || 1981 NU ||  || July 2, 1981 || Cerro El Roble || L. E. González || THM || align=right | 26 km || 
|-id=496 bgcolor=#FA8072
| 3496 Arieso || 1977 RC ||  || September 5, 1977 || La Silla || H.-E. Schuster || — || align=right | 4.7 km || 
|-id=497 bgcolor=#E9E9E9
| 3497 Innanen || 1941 HJ ||  || April 19, 1941 || Turku || L. Oterma || — || align=right | 18 km || 
|-id=498 bgcolor=#fefefe
| 3498 Belton ||  ||  || March 1, 1981 || Siding Spring || S. J. Bus || V || align=right | 3.3 km || 
|-id=499 bgcolor=#d6d6d6
| 3499 Hoppe ||  ||  || November 3, 1981 || Tautenburg Observatory || F. Börngen, K. Kirsch || THM || align=right | 16 km || 
|-id=500 bgcolor=#fefefe
| 3500 Kobayashi || A919 SD ||  || September 18, 1919 || Heidelberg || K. Reinmuth || FLO || align=right | 7.4 km || 
|}

3501–3600 

|-bgcolor=#d6d6d6
| 3501 Olegiya || 1971 QU ||  || August 18, 1971 || Nauchnij || T. M. Smirnova || CHA || align=right | 22 km || 
|-id=502 bgcolor=#d6d6d6
| 3502 Huangpu ||  ||  || October 9, 1964 || Nanking || Purple Mountain Obs. || THM || align=right | 22 km || 
|-id=503 bgcolor=#E9E9E9
| 3503 Brandt ||  ||  || March 1, 1981 || Siding Spring || S. J. Bus || EUN || align=right | 5.2 km || 
|-id=504 bgcolor=#d6d6d6
| 3504 Kholshevnikov ||  ||  || September 3, 1981 || Nauchnij || N. S. Chernykh || THM || align=right | 19 km || 
|-id=505 bgcolor=#d6d6d6
| 3505 Byrd || 1983 AM ||  || January 9, 1983 || Anderson Mesa || B. A. Skiff || EOS || align=right | 15 km || 
|-id=506 bgcolor=#d6d6d6
| 3506 French ||  ||  || February 6, 1984 || Anderson Mesa || E. Bowell || EOS || align=right | 16 km || 
|-id=507 bgcolor=#d6d6d6
| 3507 Vilas || 1982 UX ||  || October 21, 1982 || Anderson Mesa || E. Bowell || THM || align=right | 25 km || 
|-id=508 bgcolor=#E9E9E9
| 3508 Pasternak ||  ||  || February 21, 1980 || Nauchnij || L. G. Karachkina || — || align=right | 17 km || 
|-id=509 bgcolor=#E9E9E9
| 3509 Sanshui ||  ||  || October 28, 1978 || Nanking || Purple Mountain Obs. || — || align=right | 9.3 km || 
|-id=510 bgcolor=#E9E9E9
| 3510 Veeder || 1982 TP ||  || October 13, 1982 || Anderson Mesa || E. Bowell || — || align=right | 8.0 km || 
|-id=511 bgcolor=#E9E9E9
| 3511 Tsvetaeva ||  ||  || October 14, 1982 || Nauchnij || L. V. Zhuravleva, L. G. Karachkina || — || align=right | 9.6 km || 
|-id=512 bgcolor=#fefefe
| 3512 Eriepa ||  ||  || January 8, 1984 || Anderson Mesa || J. Wagner || — || align=right | 4.9 km || 
|-id=513 bgcolor=#E9E9E9
| 3513 Quqinyue || 1965 UZ ||  || October 16, 1965 || Nanking || Purple Mountain Obs. || — || align=right | 12 km || 
|-id=514 bgcolor=#d6d6d6
| 3514 Hooke || 1971 UJ ||  || October 26, 1971 || Hamburg-Bergedorf || L. Kohoutek || 3:2 || align=right | 22 km || 
|-id=515 bgcolor=#d6d6d6
| 3515 Jindra ||  ||  || October 16, 1982 || Kleť || Z. Vávrová || KOR || align=right | 7.7 km || 
|-id=516 bgcolor=#d6d6d6
| 3516 Rusheva ||  ||  || October 21, 1982 || Nauchnij || L. G. Karachkina || KOR || align=right | 11 km || 
|-id=517 bgcolor=#fefefe
| 3517 Tatianicheva ||  ||  || September 24, 1976 || Nauchnij || N. S. Chernykh || — || align=right | 5.3 km || 
|-id=518 bgcolor=#E9E9E9
| 3518 Florena ||  ||  || August 18, 1977 || Nauchnij || N. S. Chernykh || EUN || align=right | 8.6 km || 
|-id=519 bgcolor=#fefefe
| 3519 Ambiorix || 1984 DO ||  || February 23, 1984 || La Silla || H. Debehogne || — || align=right | 5.9 km || 
|-id=520 bgcolor=#fefefe
| 3520 Klopsteg || 1952 SG ||  || September 16, 1952 || Brooklyn || Indiana University || FLO || align=right | 6.8 km || 
|-id=521 bgcolor=#fefefe
| 3521 Comrie || 1982 MH ||  || June 26, 1982 || Lake Tekapo || A. C. Gilmore, P. M. Kilmartin || — || align=right | 3.9 km || 
|-id=522 bgcolor=#d6d6d6
| 3522 Becker || 1941 SW ||  || September 21, 1941 || Turku || Y. Väisälä || — || align=right | 20 km || 
|-id=523 bgcolor=#fefefe
| 3523 Arina ||  ||  || October 3, 1975 || Nauchnij || L. I. Chernykh || moon || align=right | 9.1 km || 
|-id=524 bgcolor=#E9E9E9
| 3524 Schulz ||  ||  || March 2, 1981 || Siding Spring || S. J. Bus || — || align=right | 6.5 km || 
|-id=525 bgcolor=#d6d6d6
| 3525 Paul ||  ||  || February 15, 1983 || Anderson Mesa || N. G. Thomas || — || align=right | 19 km || 
|-id=526 bgcolor=#E9E9E9
| 3526 Jeffbell || 1984 CN ||  || February 5, 1984 || Anderson Mesa || E. Bowell || — || align=right | 22 km || 
|-id=527 bgcolor=#fefefe
| 3527 McCord ||  ||  || April 15, 1985 || Anderson Mesa || E. Bowell || FLOslow || align=right | 7.2 km || 
|-id=528 bgcolor=#E9E9E9
| 3528 Counselman ||  ||  || March 2, 1981 || Siding Spring || S. J. Bus || — || align=right | 6.8 km || 
|-id=529 bgcolor=#fefefe
| 3529 Dowling ||  ||  || March 2, 1981 || Siding Spring || S. J. Bus || NYS || align=right | 6.1 km || 
|-id=530 bgcolor=#fefefe
| 3530 Hammel ||  ||  || March 2, 1981 || Siding Spring || S. J. Bus || NYS || align=right | 5.3 km || 
|-id=531 bgcolor=#E9E9E9
| 3531 Cruikshank || 1981 FB ||  || March 30, 1981 || Anderson Mesa || E. Bowell || — || align=right | 8.3 km || 
|-id=532 bgcolor=#d6d6d6
| 3532 Tracie ||  ||  || January 10, 1983 || Palomar || K. Herkenhoff, G. Ojakangas || — || align=right | 16 km || 
|-id=533 bgcolor=#fefefe
| 3533 Toyota || 1986 UE ||  || October 30, 1986 || Toyota || K. Suzuki, T. Urata || FLO || align=right | 6.1 km || 
|-id=534 bgcolor=#E9E9E9
| 3534 Sax || 1936 XA ||  || December 15, 1936 || Uccle || E. Delporte || — || align=right | 9.0 km || 
|-id=535 bgcolor=#fefefe
| 3535 Ditte ||  ||  || September 24, 1979 || Nauchnij || N. S. Chernykh || NYS || align=right | 7.1 km || 
|-id=536 bgcolor=#fefefe
| 3536 Schleicher ||  ||  || March 2, 1981 || Siding Spring || S. J. Bus || — || align=right | 3.1 km || 
|-id=537 bgcolor=#E9E9E9
| 3537 Jürgen || 1982 VT ||  || November 15, 1982 || Anderson Mesa || E. Bowell || — || align=right | 8.3 km || 
|-id=538 bgcolor=#E9E9E9
| 3538 Nelsonia || 6548 P-L ||  || September 24, 1960 || Palomar || PLS || — || align=right | 11 km || 
|-id=539 bgcolor=#E9E9E9
| 3539 Weimar ||  ||  || April 11, 1967 || Tautenburg Observatory || F. Börngen || EUN || align=right | 7.8 km || 
|-id=540 bgcolor=#C2FFFF
| 3540 Protesilaos ||  ||  || October 27, 1973 || Tautenburg Observatory || F. Börngen || L4 || align=right | 70 km || 
|-id=541 bgcolor=#fefefe
| 3541 Graham || 1984 ML ||  || June 18, 1984 || Bickley || Perth Obs. || NYS || align=right | 14 km || 
|-id=542 bgcolor=#d6d6d6
| 3542 Tanjiazhen ||  ||  || October 9, 1964 || Nanking || Purple Mountain Obs. || VER || align=right | 18 km || 
|-id=543 bgcolor=#d6d6d6
| 3543 Ningbo ||  ||  || November 11, 1964 || Nanking || Purple Mountain Obs. || THM || align=right | 22 km || 
|-id=544 bgcolor=#fefefe
| 3544 Borodino ||  ||  || September 7, 1977 || Nauchnij || N. S. Chernykh || — || align=right | 8.5 km || 
|-id=545 bgcolor=#d6d6d6
| 3545 Gaffey ||  ||  || November 20, 1981 || Anderson Mesa || E. Bowell || KOR || align=right | 12 km || 
|-id=546 bgcolor=#E9E9E9
| 3546 Atanasoff || 1983 SC ||  || September 28, 1983 || Smolyan || Bulgarian National Obs. || — || align=right | 10 km || 
|-id=547 bgcolor=#fefefe
| 3547 Serov ||  ||  || October 2, 1978 || Nauchnij || L. V. Zhuravleva || — || align=right | 5.7 km || 
|-id=548 bgcolor=#C2FFFF
| 3548 Eurybates || 1973 SO ||  || September 19, 1973 || Palomar || PLS || L4ERYmoon || align=right | 64 km || 
|-id=549 bgcolor=#E9E9E9
| 3549 Hapke || 1981 YH ||  || December 30, 1981 || Anderson Mesa || E. Bowell || — || align=right | 9.1 km || 
|-id=550 bgcolor=#d6d6d6
| 3550 Link || 1981 YS ||  || December 20, 1981 || Kleť || A. Mrkos || — || align=right | 27 km || 
|-id=551 bgcolor=#FFC2E0
| 3551 Verenia || 1983 RD ||  || September 12, 1983 || Palomar || R. S. Dunbar || AMO +1km || align=right data-sort-value="0.9" | 900 m || 
|-id=552 bgcolor=#FFC2E0
| 3552 Don Quixote || 1983 SA ||  || September 26, 1983 || Zimmerwald || P. Wild || AMO +1km || align=right | 19 km || 
|-id=553 bgcolor=#FFC2E0
| 3553 Mera || 1985 JA ||  || May 14, 1985 || Palomar || C. S. Shoemaker || AMO +1km || align=right | 1.9 km || 
|-id=554 bgcolor=#FFC2E0
| 3554 Amun || 1986 EB ||  || March 4, 1986 || Palomar || C. S. Shoemaker, E. M. Shoemaker || ATE +1km || align=right | 3.3 km || 
|-id=555 bgcolor=#E9E9E9
| 3555 Miyasaka ||  ||  || October 6, 1931 || Heidelberg || K. Reinmuth || — || align=right | 6.5 km || 
|-id=556 bgcolor=#d6d6d6
| 3556 Lixiaohua || 1964 UO ||  || October 30, 1964 || Nanking || Purple Mountain Obs. || LIX || align=right | 20 km || 
|-id=557 bgcolor=#d6d6d6
| 3557 Sokolsky ||  ||  || August 19, 1977 || Nauchnij || N. S. Chernykh || 3:2 || align=right | 35 km || 
|-id=558 bgcolor=#fefefe
| 3558 Shishkin ||  ||  || September 26, 1978 || Nauchnij || L. V. Zhuravleva || — || align=right | 8.8 km || 
|-id=559 bgcolor=#fefefe
| 3559 Violaumayer || 1980 PH ||  || August 8, 1980 || Anderson Mesa || E. Bowell || — || align=right | 10 km || 
|-id=560 bgcolor=#d6d6d6
| 3560 Chenqian ||  ||  || September 3, 1980 || Nanking || Purple Mountain Obs. || EOS || align=right | 22 km || 
|-id=561 bgcolor=#d6d6d6
| 3561 Devine || 1983 HO ||  || April 18, 1983 || Anderson Mesa || N. G. Thomas || HIL3:2 || align=right | 33 km || 
|-id=562 bgcolor=#fefefe
| 3562 Ignatius || 1984 AZ ||  || January 8, 1984 || Anderson Mesa || J. Wagner || ERI || align=right | 11 km || 
|-id=563 bgcolor=#E9E9E9
| 3563 Canterbury || 1985 FE ||  || March 23, 1985 || Lake Tekapo || A. C. Gilmore, P. M. Kilmartin || DOR || align=right | 17 km || 
|-id=564 bgcolor=#C2FFFF
| 3564 Talthybius ||  ||  || October 15, 1985 || Anderson Mesa || E. Bowell || L4 || align=right | 74 km || 
|-id=565 bgcolor=#d6d6d6
| 3565 Ojima || 1986 YD ||  || December 22, 1986 || Ojima || T. Niijima, T. Urata || — || align=right | 28 km || 
|-id=566 bgcolor=#fefefe
| 3566 Levitan ||  ||  || December 24, 1979 || Nauchnij || L. V. Zhuravleva || — || align=right | 15 km || 
|-id=567 bgcolor=#E9E9E9
| 3567 Alvema || 1930 VD ||  || November 15, 1930 || Uccle || E. Delporte || — || align=right | 15 km || 
|-id=568 bgcolor=#d6d6d6
| 3568 ASCII || 1936 UB ||  || October 17, 1936 || Nice || M. Laugier || — || align=right | 24 km || 
|-id=569 bgcolor=#E9E9E9
| 3569 Kumon ||  ||  || February 20, 1938 || Heidelberg || K. Reinmuth || EUN || align=right | 7.7 km || 
|-id=570 bgcolor=#d6d6d6
| 3570 Wuyeesun || 1979 XO ||  || December 14, 1979 || Nanking || Purple Mountain Obs. || EOS || align=right | 20 km || 
|-id=571 bgcolor=#d6d6d6
| 3571 Milanštefánik || 1982 EJ ||  || March 15, 1982 || Kleť || A. Mrkos || HIL3:2slow || align=right | 35 km || 
|-id=572 bgcolor=#E9E9E9
| 3572 Leogoldberg ||  ||  || October 28, 1954 || Brooklyn || Indiana University || — || align=right | 9.2 km || 
|-id=573 bgcolor=#fefefe
| 3573 Holmberg ||  ||  || August 16, 1982 || La Silla || C.-I. Lagerkvist || FLO || align=right | 6.2 km || 
|-id=574 bgcolor=#fefefe
| 3574 Rudaux || 1982 TQ ||  || October 13, 1982 || Anderson Mesa || E. Bowell || — || align=right | 5.1 km || 
|-id=575 bgcolor=#E9E9E9
| 3575 Anyuta ||  ||  || February 26, 1984 || Nauchnij || N. S. Chernykh || — || align=right | 12 km || 
|-id=576 bgcolor=#fefefe
| 3576 Galina ||  ||  || February 26, 1984 || Nauchnij || N. S. Chernykh || — || align=right | 7.4 km || 
|-id=577 bgcolor=#d6d6d6
| 3577 Putilin || 1969 TK ||  || October 7, 1969 || Nauchnij || L. I. Chernykh || 3:2 || align=right | 49 km || 
|-id=578 bgcolor=#d6d6d6
| 3578 Carestia || 1977 CC ||  || February 11, 1977 || El Leoncito || Félix Aguilar Obs. || — || align=right | 43 km || 
|-id=579 bgcolor=#E9E9E9
| 3579 Rockholt || 1977 YA ||  || December 18, 1977 || Piszkéstető || M. Lovas || PAL || align=right | 6.9 km || 
|-id=580 bgcolor=#d6d6d6
| 3580 Avery ||  ||  || February 15, 1983 || Anderson Mesa || N. G. Thomas || — || align=right | 8.5 km || 
|-id=581 bgcolor=#FA8072
| 3581 Alvarez || 1985 HC ||  || April 23, 1985 || Palomar || C. S. Shoemaker || — || align=right | 19 km || 
|-id=582 bgcolor=#d6d6d6
| 3582 Cyrano ||  ||  || October 2, 1986 || Zimmerwald || P. Wild || EOS || align=right | 16 km || 
|-id=583 bgcolor=#fefefe
| 3583 Burdett || 1929 TQ ||  || October 5, 1929 || Flagstaff || C. W. Tombaugh || NYS || align=right | 6.6 km || 
|-id=584 bgcolor=#d6d6d6
| 3584 Aisha || 1981 TW ||  || October 5, 1981 || Anderson Mesa || N. G. Thomas || — || align=right | 28 km || 
|-id=585 bgcolor=#d6d6d6
| 3585 Goshirakawa || 1987 BE ||  || January 28, 1987 || Ojima || T. Niijima, T. Urata || — || align=right | 15 km || 
|-id=586 bgcolor=#fefefe
| 3586 Vasnetsov ||  ||  || September 26, 1978 || Nauchnij || L. V. Zhuravleva || — || align=right | 7.2 km || 
|-id=587 bgcolor=#E9E9E9
| 3587 Descartes ||  ||  || September 8, 1981 || Nauchnij || L. V. Zhuravleva || — || align=right | 15 km || 
|-id=588 bgcolor=#d6d6d6
| 3588 Kirik ||  ||  || October 8, 1981 || Nauchnij || L. I. Chernykh || — || align=right | 20 km || 
|-id=589 bgcolor=#fefefe
| 3589 Loyola ||  ||  || January 8, 1984 || Anderson Mesa || J. Wagner || FLO || align=right | 4.3 km || 
|-id=590 bgcolor=#fefefe
| 3590 Holst || 1984 CQ ||  || February 5, 1984 || Anderson Mesa || E. Bowell || FLO || align=right | 5.3 km || 
|-id=591 bgcolor=#d6d6d6
| 3591 Vladimirskij ||  ||  || August 31, 1978 || Nauchnij || N. S. Chernykh || THM || align=right | 16 km || 
|-id=592 bgcolor=#fefefe
| 3592 Nedbal || 1980 CT ||  || February 15, 1980 || Kleť || Z. Vávrová || — || align=right | 5.4 km || 
|-id=593 bgcolor=#fefefe
| 3593 Osip ||  ||  || March 2, 1981 || Siding Spring || S. J. Bus || — || align=right | 4.3 km || 
|-id=594 bgcolor=#E9E9E9
| 3594 Scotti || 1983 CN ||  || February 11, 1983 || Anderson Mesa || E. Bowell || MAR || align=right | 7.1 km || 
|-id=595 bgcolor=#E9E9E9
| 3595 Gallagher ||  ||  || October 15, 1985 || Anderson Mesa || E. Bowell || — || align=right | 7.7 km || 
|-id=596 bgcolor=#C2FFFF
| 3596 Meriones || 1985 VO ||  || November 14, 1985 || Brorfelde || P. Jensen, K. Augustesen || L4 || align=right | 87 km || 
|-id=597 bgcolor=#d6d6d6
| 3597 Kakkuri || 1941 UL ||  || October 15, 1941 || Turku || L. Oterma || THM || align=right | 18 km || 
|-id=598 bgcolor=#d6d6d6
| 3598 Saucier ||  ||  || May 18, 1977 || Palomar || E. Howell Bus || THM || align=right | 19 km || 
|-id=599 bgcolor=#d6d6d6
| 3599 Basov ||  ||  || August 8, 1978 || Nauchnij || N. S. Chernykh || THMfast || align=right | 18 km || 
|-id=600 bgcolor=#E9E9E9
| 3600 Archimedes ||  ||  || September 26, 1978 || Nauchnij || L. V. Zhuravleva || RAF || align=right | 6.8 km || 
|}

3601–3700 

|-bgcolor=#d6d6d6
| 3601 Velikhov ||  ||  || September 22, 1979 || Nauchnij || N. S. Chernykh || THM || align=right | 13 km || 
|-id=602 bgcolor=#fefefe
| 3602 Lazzaro ||  ||  || February 28, 1981 || Siding Spring || S. J. Bus || — || align=right | 4.1 km || 
|-id=603 bgcolor=#E9E9E9
| 3603 Gajdušek || 1981 RM ||  || September 5, 1981 || Kleť || L. Brožek || — || align=right | 7.6 km || 
|-id=604 bgcolor=#E9E9E9
| 3604 Berkhuijsen || 5550 P-L ||  || October 17, 1960 || Palomar || PLS || ADE || align=right | 13 km || 
|-id=605 bgcolor=#fefefe
| 3605 Davy || 1932 WB ||  || November 28, 1932 || Uccle || E. Delporte || FLO || align=right | 6.0 km || 
|-id=606 bgcolor=#E9E9E9
| 3606 Pohjola || 1939 SF ||  || September 19, 1939 || Turku || Y. Väisälä || — || align=right | 8.9 km || 
|-id=607 bgcolor=#fefefe
| 3607 Naniwa ||  ||  || February 18, 1977 || Kiso || H. Kosai, K. Furukawa || — || align=right | 4.0 km || 
|-id=608 bgcolor=#d6d6d6
| 3608 Kataev ||  ||  || September 27, 1978 || Nauchnij || L. I. Chernykh || 7:4 || align=right | 28 km || 
|-id=609 bgcolor=#d6d6d6
| 3609 Liloketai ||  ||  || November 13, 1980 || Nanking || Purple Mountain Obs. || — || align=right | 18 km || 
|-id=610 bgcolor=#fefefe
| 3610 Decampos ||  ||  || March 5, 1981 || La Silla || H. Debehogne, G. DeSanctis || — || align=right | 4.6 km || 
|-id=611 bgcolor=#E9E9E9
| 3611 Dabu ||  ||  || December 20, 1981 || Nanking || Purple Mountain Obs. || DOR || align=right | 14 km || 
|-id=612 bgcolor=#fefefe
| 3612 Peale || 1982 TW ||  || October 13, 1982 || Anderson Mesa || E. Bowell || NYS || align=right | 11 km || 
|-id=613 bgcolor=#fefefe
| 3613 Kunlun ||  ||  || November 10, 1982 || Nanking || Purple Mountain Obs. || V || align=right | 5.8 km || 
|-id=614 bgcolor=#d6d6d6
| 3614 Tumilty ||  ||  || January 12, 1983 || Anderson Mesa || N. G. Thomas || — || align=right | 48 km || 
|-id=615 bgcolor=#d6d6d6
| 3615 Safronov || 1983 WZ ||  || November 29, 1983 || Anderson Mesa || E. Bowell || THM || align=right | 25 km || 
|-id=616 bgcolor=#E9E9E9
| 3616 Glazunov ||  ||  || May 3, 1984 || Nauchnij || L. V. Zhuravleva || — || align=right | 9.8 km || 
|-id=617 bgcolor=#E9E9E9
| 3617 Eicher || 1984 LJ ||  || June 2, 1984 || Anderson Mesa || B. A. Skiff || — || align=right | 9.2 km || 
|-id=618 bgcolor=#d6d6d6
| 3618 Kuprin ||  ||  || August 20, 1979 || Nauchnij || N. S. Chernykh || — || align=right | 16 km || 
|-id=619 bgcolor=#fefefe
| 3619 Nash ||  ||  || March 2, 1981 || Siding Spring || S. J. Bus || — || align=right | 4.5 km || 
|-id=620 bgcolor=#d6d6d6
| 3620 Platonov ||  ||  || September 7, 1981 || Nauchnij || L. G. Karachkina || EOS || align=right | 13 km || 
|-id=621 bgcolor=#d6d6d6
| 3621 Curtis ||  ||  || September 26, 1981 || Anderson Mesa || N. G. Thomas || — || align=right | 16 km || 
|-id=622 bgcolor=#d6d6d6
| 3622 Ilinsky ||  ||  || September 29, 1981 || Nauchnij || L. V. Zhuravleva || 7:4 || align=right | 22 km || 
|-id=623 bgcolor=#d6d6d6
| 3623 Chaplin ||  ||  || October 4, 1981 || Nauchnij || L. G. Karachkina || KORmoon || align=right | 9.9 km || 
|-id=624 bgcolor=#fefefe
| 3624 Mironov ||  ||  || October 14, 1982 || Nauchnij || L. V. Zhuravleva, L. G. Karachkina || FLO || align=right | 8.3 km || 
|-id=625 bgcolor=#d6d6d6
| 3625 Fracastoro ||  ||  || April 27, 1984 || La Silla || W. Ferreri || — || align=right | 14 km || 
|-id=626 bgcolor=#d6d6d6
| 3626 Ohsaki || 1929 PA ||  || August 4, 1929 || Heidelberg || M. F. Wolf || HYG || align=right | 18 km || 
|-id=627 bgcolor=#fefefe
| 3627 Sayers || 1973 DS ||  || February 28, 1973 || Hamburg-Bergedorf || L. Kohoutek || KLI || align=right | 11 km || 
|-id=628 bgcolor=#E9E9E9
| 3628 Božněmcová || 1979 WD ||  || November 25, 1979 || Kleť || Z. Vávrová || — || align=right | 6.9 km || 
|-id=629 bgcolor=#fefefe
| 3629 Lebedinskij || 1982 WK ||  || November 21, 1982 || Kleť || A. Mrkos || V || align=right | 5.8 km || 
|-id=630 bgcolor=#E9E9E9
| 3630 Lubomír || 1984 QN ||  || August 28, 1984 || Kleť || A. Mrkos || DOR || align=right | 13 km || 
|-id=631 bgcolor=#d6d6d6
| 3631 Sigyn ||  ||  || January 25, 1987 || La Silla || E. W. Elst || — || align=right | 39 km || 
|-id=632 bgcolor=#E9E9E9
| 3632 Grachevka ||  ||  || September 24, 1976 || Nauchnij || N. S. Chernykh || — || align=right | 9.1 km || 
|-id=633 bgcolor=#fefefe
| 3633 Mira ||  ||  || March 13, 1980 || El Leoncito || Félix Aguilar Obs. || FLO || align=right | 9.5 km || 
|-id=634 bgcolor=#fefefe
| 3634 Iwan || 1980 FV ||  || March 16, 1980 || La Silla || C.-I. Lagerkvist || — || align=right | 5.2 km || 
|-id=635 bgcolor=#FA8072
| 3635 Kreutz ||  ||  || November 21, 1981 || Calar Alto || L. Kohoutek || slow || align=right | 3.1 km || 
|-id=636 bgcolor=#fefefe
| 3636 Pajdušáková ||  ||  || October 17, 1982 || Kleť || A. Mrkos || — || align=right | 4.1 km || 
|-id=637 bgcolor=#E9E9E9
| 3637 O'Meara || 1984 UQ ||  || October 23, 1984 || Anderson Mesa || B. A. Skiff || — || align=right | 13 km || 
|-id=638 bgcolor=#d6d6d6
| 3638 Davis || 1984 WX ||  || November 20, 1984 || Anderson Mesa || E. Bowell || EOS || align=right | 18 km || 
|-id=639 bgcolor=#fefefe
| 3639 Weidenschilling || 1985 TX ||  || October 15, 1985 || Anderson Mesa || E. Bowell || — || align=right | 6.5 km || 
|-id=640 bgcolor=#fefefe
| 3640 Gostin ||  ||  || October 11, 1985 || Palomar || C. S. Shoemaker || FLO || align=right | 7.1 km || 
|-id=641 bgcolor=#d6d6d6
| 3641 Williams Bay || A922 WC ||  || November 24, 1922 || Williams Bay || G. Van Biesbroeck || — || align=right | 30 km || 
|-id=642 bgcolor=#E9E9E9
| 3642 Frieden ||  ||  || December 4, 1953 || Sonneberg || H. Gessner || — || align=right | 32 km || 
|-id=643 bgcolor=#fefefe
| 3643 Tienchanglin ||  ||  || October 29, 1978 || Nanking || Purple Mountain Obs. || — || align=right | 9.8 km || 
|-id=644 bgcolor=#fefefe
| 3644 Kojitaku || 1931 TW ||  || October 5, 1931 || Heidelberg || K. Reinmuth || FLO || align=right | 5.8 km || 
|-id=645 bgcolor=#E9E9E9
| 3645 Fabini || 1981 QZ ||  || August 28, 1981 || Kleť || A. Mrkos || — || align=right | 20 km || 
|-id=646 bgcolor=#E9E9E9
| 3646 Aduatiques ||  ||  || September 11, 1985 || La Silla || H. Debehogne || — || align=right | 6.3 km || 
|-id=647 bgcolor=#E9E9E9
| 3647 Dermott ||  ||  || January 11, 1986 || Anderson Mesa || E. Bowell || — || align=right | 27 km || 
|-id=648 bgcolor=#fefefe
| 3648 Raffinetti || 1957 HK ||  || April 24, 1957 || La Plata Observatory || La Plata Obs. || — || align=right | 5.3 km || 
|-id=649 bgcolor=#d6d6d6
| 3649 Guillermina || 1976 HQ ||  || April 26, 1976 || El Leoncito || Félix Aguilar Obs. || — || align=right | 22 km || 
|-id=650 bgcolor=#d6d6d6
| 3650 Kunming ||  ||  || October 30, 1978 || Nanking || Purple Mountain Obs. || — || align=right | 27 km || 
|-id=651 bgcolor=#fefefe
| 3651 Friedman ||  ||  || November 7, 1978 || Palomar || E. F. Helin, S. J. Bus || — || align=right | 5.6 km || 
|-id=652 bgcolor=#fefefe
| 3652 Soros ||  ||  || October 6, 1981 || Nauchnij || T. M. Smirnova || NYS || align=right | 13 km || 
|-id=653 bgcolor=#fefefe
| 3653 Klimishin ||  ||  || April 25, 1979 || Nauchnij || N. S. Chernykh || — || align=right | 5.4 km || 
|-id=654 bgcolor=#fefefe
| 3654 AAS ||  ||  || August 21, 1949 || Brooklyn || Indiana University || — || align=right | 4.3 km || 
|-id=655 bgcolor=#d6d6d6
| 3655 Eupraksia ||  ||  || September 26, 1978 || Nauchnij || L. V. Zhuravleva || 3:2 || align=right | 37 km || 
|-id=656 bgcolor=#fefefe
| 3656 Hemingway || 1978 QX ||  || August 31, 1978 || Nauchnij || N. S. Chernykh || — || align=right | 5.3 km || 
|-id=657 bgcolor=#fefefe
| 3657 Ermolova ||  ||  || September 26, 1978 || Nauchnij || L. V. Zhuravleva || Vmoon || align=right | 6.7 km || 
|-id=658 bgcolor=#fefefe
| 3658 Feldman || 1982 TR ||  || October 13, 1982 || Anderson Mesa || E. Bowell || — || align=right | 5.0 km || 
|-id=659 bgcolor=#E9E9E9
| 3659 Bellingshausen ||  ||  || October 8, 1969 || Nauchnij || L. I. Chernykh || — || align=right | 4.8 km || 
|-id=660 bgcolor=#d6d6d6
| 3660 Lazarev ||  ||  || August 31, 1978 || Nauchnij || N. S. Chernykh || — || align=right | 26 km || 
|-id=661 bgcolor=#d6d6d6
| 3661 Dolmatovskij ||  ||  || October 16, 1979 || Nauchnij || N. S. Chernykh || KOR || align=right | 12 km || 
|-id=662 bgcolor=#E9E9E9
| 3662 Dezhnev ||  ||  || September 8, 1980 || Nauchnij || L. V. Zhuravleva || EUN || align=right | 9.4 km || 
|-id=663 bgcolor=#d6d6d6
| 3663 Tisserand ||  ||  || April 15, 1985 || Anderson Mesa || E. Bowell || THM || align=right | 13 km || 
|-id=664 bgcolor=#E9E9E9
| 3664 Anneres || 4260 P-L ||  || September 24, 1960 || Palomar || PLS || — || align=right | 9.2 km || 
|-id=665 bgcolor=#fefefe
| 3665 Fitzgerald || 1979 FE ||  || March 19, 1979 || Kleť || A. Mrkos || — || align=right | 7.7 km || 
|-id=666 bgcolor=#d6d6d6
| 3666 Holman || 1979 HP ||  || April 19, 1979 || Cerro Tololo || J. C. Muzzio || THM || align=right | 20 km || 
|-id=667 bgcolor=#d6d6d6
| 3667 Anne-Marie || 1981 EF ||  || March 9, 1981 || Anderson Mesa || E. Bowell || TIR || align=right | 22 km || 
|-id=668 bgcolor=#fefefe
| 3668 Ilfpetrov ||  ||  || October 21, 1982 || Nauchnij || L. G. Karachkina || — || align=right | 6.5 km || 
|-id=669 bgcolor=#fefefe
| 3669 Vertinskij ||  ||  || October 21, 1982 || Nauchnij || L. G. Karachkina || FLOmoon || align=right | 6.2 km || 
|-id=670 bgcolor=#E9E9E9
| 3670 Northcott || 1983 BN ||  || January 22, 1983 || Anderson Mesa || E. Bowell || PAD || align=right | 19 km || 
|-id=671 bgcolor=#FFC2E0
| 3671 Dionysus || 1984 KD ||  || May 27, 1984 || Palomar || C. S. Shoemaker, E. M. Shoemaker || APO +1kmPHAmoon || align=right | 1.5 km || 
|-id=672 bgcolor=#fefefe
| 3672 Stevedberg || 1985 QQ ||  || August 22, 1985 || Anderson Mesa || E. Bowell || FLO || align=right | 5.6 km || 
|-id=673 bgcolor=#fefefe
| 3673 Levy || 1985 QS ||  || August 22, 1985 || Anderson Mesa || E. Bowell || moon || align=right | 6.4 km || 
|-id=674 bgcolor=#FA8072
| 3674 Erbisbühl || 1963 RH ||  || September 13, 1963 || Sonneberg || C. Hoffmeister || — || align=right | 9.1 km || 
|-id=675 bgcolor=#d6d6d6
| 3675 Kemstach ||  ||  || December 23, 1982 || Nauchnij || L. G. Karachkina || 7:4 || align=right | 19 km || 
|-id=676 bgcolor=#fefefe
| 3676 Hahn || 1984 GA ||  || April 3, 1984 || Anderson Mesa || E. Bowell || — || align=right | 5.0 km || 
|-id=677 bgcolor=#fefefe
| 3677 Magnusson ||  ||  || August 31, 1984 || Anderson Mesa || E. Bowell || FLO || align=right | 4.8 km || 
|-id=678 bgcolor=#E9E9E9
| 3678 Mongmanwai || 1966 BO ||  || January 20, 1966 || Nanking || Purple Mountain Obs. || — || align=right | 8.0 km || 
|-id=679 bgcolor=#fefefe
| 3679 Condruses || 1984 DT ||  || February 24, 1984 || La Silla || H. Debehogne || slow || align=right | 5.2 km || 
|-id=680 bgcolor=#fefefe
| 3680 Sasha || 1987 MY ||  || June 28, 1987 || Palomar || E. F. Helin || FLO || align=right | 6.1 km || 
|-id=681 bgcolor=#fefefe
| 3681 Boyan ||  ||  || August 27, 1974 || Nauchnij || L. I. Chernykh || — || align=right | 4.6 km || 
|-id=682 bgcolor=#E9E9E9
| 3682 Welther || A923 NB ||  || July 12, 1923 || Heidelberg || K. Reinmuth || — || align=right | 19 km || 
|-id=683 bgcolor=#d6d6d6
| 3683 Baumann || 1987 MA ||  || June 23, 1987 || La Silla || W. Landgraf || — || align=right | 20 km || 
|-id=684 bgcolor=#fefefe
| 3684 Berry || 1983 AK ||  || January 9, 1983 || Anderson Mesa || B. A. Skiff || — || align=right | 12 km || 
|-id=685 bgcolor=#E9E9E9
| 3685 Derdenye ||  ||  || March 1, 1981 || Siding Spring || S. J. Bus || — || align=right | 10 km || 
|-id=686 bgcolor=#E9E9E9
| 3686 Antoku || 1987 EB ||  || March 3, 1987 || Ojima || T. Niijima, T. Urata || — || align=right | 18 km || 
|-id=687 bgcolor=#E9E9E9
| 3687 Dzus || A908 TC ||  || October 7, 1908 || Heidelberg || A. Kopff || — || align=right | 31 km || 
|-id=688 bgcolor=#d6d6d6
| 3688 Navajo || 1981 FD ||  || March 30, 1981 || Anderson Mesa || E. Bowell || 2:1J || align=right | 6.1 km || 
|-id=689 bgcolor=#d6d6d6
| 3689 Yeates ||  ||  || May 5, 1981 || Palomar || C. S. Shoemaker || — || align=right | 14 km || 
|-id=690 bgcolor=#fefefe
| 3690 Larson || 1981 PM ||  || August 3, 1981 || Anderson Mesa || E. Bowell || FLO || align=right | 5.0 km || 
|-id=691 bgcolor=#FFC2E0
| 3691 Bede || 1982 FT ||  || March 29, 1982 || Cerro El Roble || L. E. González || AMO +1kmslow || align=right | 4.3 km || 
|-id=692 bgcolor=#E9E9E9
| 3692 Rickman ||  ||  || April 25, 1982 || Anderson Mesa || E. Bowell || — || align=right | 12 km || 
|-id=693 bgcolor=#d6d6d6
| 3693 Barringer || 1982 RU ||  || September 15, 1982 || Anderson Mesa || E. Bowell || MEL || align=right | 27 km || 
|-id=694 bgcolor=#d6d6d6
| 3694 Sharon ||  ||  || September 27, 1984 || Palomar || A. Grossman || 3:2 || align=right | 46 km || 
|-id=695 bgcolor=#fefefe
| 3695 Fiala ||  ||  || October 21, 1973 || Anderson Mesa || H. L. Giclas || — || align=right | 7.7 km || 
|-id=696 bgcolor=#d6d6d6
| 3696 Herald || 1980 OF ||  || July 17, 1980 || Anderson Mesa || E. Bowell || — || align=right | 16 km || 
|-id=697 bgcolor=#fefefe
| 3697 Guyhurst || 1984 EV ||  || March 6, 1984 || Anderson Mesa || E. Bowell || V || align=right | 4.3 km || 
|-id=698 bgcolor=#fefefe
| 3698 Manning ||  ||  || October 29, 1984 || Anderson Mesa || E. Bowell || NYS || align=right | 6.0 km || 
|-id=699 bgcolor=#fefefe
| 3699 Milbourn ||  ||  || October 29, 1984 || Anderson Mesa || E. Bowell || — || align=right | 4.7 km || 
|-id=700 bgcolor=#fefefe
| 3700 Geowilliams ||  ||  || October 23, 1984 || Palomar || C. S. Shoemaker, E. M. Shoemaker || — || align=right | 7.8 km || 
|}

3701–3800 

|-bgcolor=#E9E9E9
| 3701 Purkyně || 1985 DW ||  || February 20, 1985 || Kleť || A. Mrkos || AGN || align=right | 9.0 km || 
|-id=702 bgcolor=#E9E9E9
| 3702 Trubetskaya || 1970 NB ||  || July 3, 1970 || Nauchnij || L. I. Chernykh || — || align=right | 18 km || 
|-id=703 bgcolor=#fefefe
| 3703 Volkonskaya ||  ||  || August 9, 1978 || Nauchnij || L. I. Chernykh || Vmoon || align=right | 3.7 km || 
|-id=704 bgcolor=#fefefe
| 3704 Gaoshiqi ||  ||  || December 20, 1981 || Nanking || Purple Mountain Obs. || — || align=right | 9.6 km || 
|-id=705 bgcolor=#d6d6d6
| 3705 Hotellasilla ||  ||  || March 4, 1984 || La Silla || H. Debehogne || THM || align=right | 18 km || 
|-id=706 bgcolor=#fefefe
| 3706 Sinnott ||  ||  || September 28, 1984 || Anderson Mesa || B. A. Skiff || — || align=right | 4.5 km || 
|-id=707 bgcolor=#E9E9E9
| 3707 Schröter || 1934 CC ||  || February 5, 1934 || Heidelberg || K. Reinmuth || EUN || align=right | 9.3 km || 
|-id=708 bgcolor=#C2FFFF
| 3708 Socus ||  ||  || March 21, 1974 || Cerro El Roble || University of Chile || L5 || align=right | 76 km || 
|-id=709 bgcolor=#C2FFFF
| 3709 Polypoites ||  ||  || October 14, 1985 || Palomar || C. S. Shoemaker || L4 || align=right | 65 km || 
|-id=710 bgcolor=#E9E9E9
| 3710 Bogoslovskij ||  ||  || September 13, 1978 || Nauchnij || N. S. Chernykh || — || align=right | 12 km || 
|-id=711 bgcolor=#E9E9E9
| 3711 Ellensburg || 1983 QD ||  || August 31, 1983 || Palomar || J. Gibson || EUN || align=right | 6.8 km || 
|-id=712 bgcolor=#E9E9E9
| 3712 Kraft || 1984 YC ||  || December 22, 1984 || Mount Hamilton || E. A. Harlan, A. R. Klemola || — || align=right | 11 km || 
|-id=713 bgcolor=#d6d6d6
| 3713 Pieters ||  ||  || March 22, 1985 || Anderson Mesa || E. Bowell || EOS || align=right | 16 km || 
|-id=714 bgcolor=#E9E9E9
| 3714 Kenrussell ||  ||  || October 12, 1983 || Anderson Mesa || E. Bowell || EUN || align=right | 11 km || 
|-id=715 bgcolor=#fefefe
| 3715 Štohl || 1980 DS ||  || February 19, 1980 || Kleť || A. Mrkos || — || align=right | 4.9 km || 
|-id=716 bgcolor=#fefefe
| 3716 Petzval || 1980 TG ||  || October 2, 1980 || Kleť || A. Mrkos || NYS || align=right | 4.7 km || 
|-id=717 bgcolor=#d6d6d6
| 3717 Thorenia || 1964 CG ||  || February 15, 1964 || Brooklyn || Indiana University || — || align=right | 17 km || 
|-id=718 bgcolor=#E9E9E9
| 3718 Dunbar ||  ||  || November 7, 1978 || Palomar || E. F. Helin, S. J. Bus || HEN || align=right | 7.0 km || 
|-id=719 bgcolor=#fefefe
| 3719 Karamzin ||  ||  || December 16, 1976 || Nauchnij || L. I. Chernykh || — || align=right | 5.0 km || 
|-id=720 bgcolor=#fefefe
| 3720 Hokkaido ||  ||  || October 28, 1987 || Kushiro || S. Ueda, H. Kaneda || V || align=right | 4.3 km || 
|-id=721 bgcolor=#d6d6d6
| 3721 Widorn || 1982 TU ||  || October 13, 1982 || Anderson Mesa || E. Bowell || — || align=right | 14 km || 
|-id=722 bgcolor=#fefefe
| 3722 Urata || 1927 UE ||  || October 29, 1927 || Heidelberg || K. Reinmuth || — || align=right | 7.9 km || 
|-id=723 bgcolor=#fefefe
| 3723 Voznesenskij ||  ||  || April 1, 1976 || Nauchnij || N. S. Chernykh || — || align=right | 9.7 km || 
|-id=724 bgcolor=#E9E9E9
| 3724 Annenskij ||  ||  || December 23, 1979 || Nauchnij || L. V. Zhuravleva || GEF || align=right | 15 km || 
|-id=725 bgcolor=#E9E9E9
| 3725 Valsecchi ||  ||  || March 1, 1981 || Siding Spring || S. J. Bus || — || align=right | 7.3 km || 
|-id=726 bgcolor=#d6d6d6
| 3726 Johnadams || 1981 LJ ||  || June 4, 1981 || Anderson Mesa || E. Bowell || KOR || align=right | 10 km || 
|-id=727 bgcolor=#d6d6d6
| 3727 Maxhell || 1981 PQ ||  || August 7, 1981 || Kleť || A. Mrkos || 7:4 || align=right | 28 km || 
|-id=728 bgcolor=#E9E9E9
| 3728 IRAS || 1983 QF ||  || August 23, 1983 || IRAS || IRAS || — || align=right | 23 km || 
|-id=729 bgcolor=#E9E9E9
| 3729 Yangzhou ||  ||  || November 1, 1983 || Nanking || Purple Mountain Obs. || EUN || align=right | 13 km || 
|-id=730 bgcolor=#E9E9E9
| 3730 Hurban ||  ||  || December 4, 1983 || Piszkéstető || M. Antal || — || align=right | 27 km || 
|-id=731 bgcolor=#d6d6d6
| 3731 Hancock ||  ||  || February 20, 1984 || Bickley || Perth Obs. || — || align=right | 53 km || 
|-id=732 bgcolor=#fefefe
| 3732 Vávra ||  ||  || September 27, 1984 || Kleť || Z. Vávrová || — || align=right | 3.8 km || 
|-id=733 bgcolor=#fefefe
| 3733 Yoshitomo || 1985 AF ||  || January 15, 1985 || Toyota || K. Suzuki, T. Urata || — || align=right | 13 km || 
|-id=734 bgcolor=#E9E9E9
| 3734 Waland || 9527 P-L ||  || October 17, 1960 || Palomar || PLS || — || align=right | 9.0 km || 
|-id=735 bgcolor=#d6d6d6
| 3735 Třeboň || 1983 XS ||  || December 4, 1983 || Kleť || Z. Vávrová || — || align=right | 21 km || 
|-id=736 bgcolor=#d6d6d6
| 3736 Rokoske ||  ||  || September 26, 1987 || Anderson Mesa || E. Bowell || EOS || align=right | 20 km || 
|-id=737 bgcolor=#FA8072
| 3737 Beckman || 1983 PA ||  || August 8, 1983 || Palomar || E. F. Helin || — || align=right | 7.0 km || 
|-id=738 bgcolor=#fefefe
| 3738 Ots ||  ||  || August 19, 1977 || Nauchnij || N. S. Chernykh || — || align=right | 7.0 km || 
|-id=739 bgcolor=#fefefe
| 3739 Rem ||  ||  || September 8, 1977 || Nauchnij || N. S. Chernykh || FLO || align=right | 6.7 km || 
|-id=740 bgcolor=#fefefe
| 3740 Menge || 1981 EM ||  || March 1, 1981 || La Silla || H. Debehogne, G. DeSanctis || — || align=right | 8.6 km || 
|-id=741 bgcolor=#E9E9E9
| 3741 Rogerburns ||  ||  || March 2, 1981 || Siding Spring || S. J. Bus || — || align=right | 6.1 km || 
|-id=742 bgcolor=#E9E9E9
| 3742 Sunshine ||  ||  || March 2, 1981 || Siding Spring || S. J. Bus || — || align=right | 5.3 km || 
|-id=743 bgcolor=#fefefe
| 3743 Pauljaniczek || 1983 EW ||  || March 10, 1983 || Anderson Mesa || E. Barr || — || align=right | 4.6 km || 
|-id=744 bgcolor=#E9E9E9
| 3744 Horn-d'Arturo || 1983 VE ||  || November 5, 1983 || Bologna || San Vittore Obs. || — || align=right | 15 km || 
|-id=745 bgcolor=#fefefe
| 3745 Petaev || 1949 SF ||  || September 23, 1949 || Heidelberg || K. Reinmuth || — || align=right | 11 km || 
|-id=746 bgcolor=#d6d6d6
| 3746 Heyuan ||  ||  || October 8, 1964 || Nanking || Purple Mountain Obs. || — || align=right | 15 km || 
|-id=747 bgcolor=#d6d6d6
| 3747 Belinskij ||  ||  || November 5, 1975 || Nauchnij || L. I. Chernykh || — || align=right | 27 km || 
|-id=748 bgcolor=#E9E9E9
| 3748 Tatum || 1981 JQ ||  || May 3, 1981 || Anderson Mesa || E. Bowell || — || align=right | 8.6 km || 
|-id=749 bgcolor=#fefefe
| 3749 Balam ||  ||  || January 24, 1982 || Anderson Mesa || E. Bowell || FLOmoon || align=right | 4.7 km || 
|-id=750 bgcolor=#d6d6d6
| 3750 Ilizarov ||  ||  || October 14, 1982 || Nauchnij || L. G. Karachkina || EOS || align=right | 12 km || 
|-id=751 bgcolor=#d6d6d6
| 3751 Kiang || 1983 NK ||  || July 10, 1983 || Anderson Mesa || E. Bowell || — || align=right | 24 km || 
|-id=752 bgcolor=#FFC2E0
| 3752 Camillo || 1985 PA ||  || August 15, 1985 || Caussols || E. F. Helin, M. A. Barucci || APO +1km || align=right | 2.3 km || 
|-id=753 bgcolor=#FFC2E0
| 3753 Cruithne || 1986 TO ||  || October 10, 1986 || Siding Spring || J. D. Waldron || ATE +1km || align=right | 2.1 km || 
|-id=754 bgcolor=#d6d6d6
| 3754 Kathleen || 1931 FM ||  || March 16, 1931 || Flagstaff || C. W. Tombaugh || — || align=right | 54 km || 
|-id=755 bgcolor=#fefefe
| 3755 Lecointe || 1950 SJ ||  || September 19, 1950 || Uccle || S. Arend || — || align=right | 4.8 km || 
|-id=756 bgcolor=#fefefe
| 3756 Ruscannon ||  ||  || June 25, 1979 || Siding Spring || E. F. Helin, S. J. Bus || — || align=right | 5.9 km || 
|-id=757 bgcolor=#FFC2E0
| 3757 Anagolay || 1982 XB ||  || December 14, 1982 || Palomar || E. F. Helin || APOPHA || align=right data-sort-value="0.5" | 500 m || 
|-id=758 bgcolor=#E9E9E9
| 3758 Karttunen || 1983 WP ||  || November 28, 1983 || Anderson Mesa || E. Bowell || EUN || align=right | 7.8 km || 
|-id=759 bgcolor=#E9E9E9
| 3759 Piironen || 1984 AP ||  || January 8, 1984 || Anderson Mesa || E. Bowell || slow || align=right | 32 km || 
|-id=760 bgcolor=#E9E9E9
| 3760 Poutanen || 1984 AQ ||  || January 8, 1984 || Anderson Mesa || E. Bowell || — || align=right | 9.0 km || 
|-id=761 bgcolor=#d6d6d6
| 3761 Romanskaya || 1936 OH ||  || July 25, 1936 || Crimea-Simeis || G. N. Neujmin || — || align=right | 33 km || 
|-id=762 bgcolor=#fefefe
| 3762 Amaravella ||  ||  || August 26, 1976 || Nauchnij || N. S. Chernykh || — || align=right | 3.9 km || 
|-id=763 bgcolor=#fefefe
| 3763 Qianxuesen ||  ||  || October 14, 1980 || Nanking || Purple Mountain Obs. || FLO || align=right | 7.0 km || 
|-id=764 bgcolor=#fefefe
| 3764 Holmesacourt ||  ||  || October 10, 1980 || Bickley || Perth Obs. || FLO || align=right | 5.7 km || 
|-id=765 bgcolor=#d6d6d6
| 3765 Texereau ||  ||  || September 16, 1982 || Caussols || K. Tomita || KOR || align=right | 7.4 km || 
|-id=766 bgcolor=#d6d6d6
| 3766 Junepatterson || 1983 BF ||  || January 16, 1983 || Anderson Mesa || E. Bowell || THM || align=right | 25 km || 
|-id=767 bgcolor=#E9E9E9
| 3767 DiMaggio || 1986 LC ||  || June 3, 1986 || Palomar || E. F. Helin || — || align=right | 13 km || 
|-id=768 bgcolor=#d6d6d6
| 3768 Monroe || 1937 RB ||  || September 5, 1937 || Johannesburg || C. Jackson || — || align=right | 27 km || 
|-id=769 bgcolor=#fefefe
| 3769 Arthurmiller || 1967 UV ||  || October 30, 1967 || Hamburg-Bergedorf || L. Kohoutek, A. Kriete || FLO || align=right | 4.8 km || 
|-id=770 bgcolor=#fefefe
| 3770 Nizami ||  ||  || August 24, 1974 || Nauchnij || L. I. Chernykh || — || align=right | 3.4 km || 
|-id=771 bgcolor=#fefefe
| 3771 Alexejtolstoj ||  ||  || September 20, 1974 || Nauchnij || L. V. Zhuravleva || FLO || align=right | 3.7 km || 
|-id=772 bgcolor=#d6d6d6
| 3772 Piaf ||  ||  || October 21, 1982 || Nauchnij || L. G. Karachkina || EOS || align=right | 19 km || 
|-id=773 bgcolor=#fefefe
| 3773 Smithsonian || 1984 YY ||  || December 23, 1984 || Harvard Observatory || Oak Ridge Observatory || — || align=right | 6.4 km || 
|-id=774 bgcolor=#d6d6d6
| 3774 Megumi || 1987 YC ||  || December 20, 1987 || Chiyoda || T. Kojima || EOS || align=right | 18 km || 
|-id=775 bgcolor=#E9E9E9
| 3775 Ellenbeth ||  ||  || October 6, 1931 || Flagstaff || C. W. Tombaugh || DOR || align=right | 17 km || 
|-id=776 bgcolor=#d6d6d6
| 3776 Vartiovuori || 1938 GG ||  || April 5, 1938 || Turku || H. Alikoski || — || align=right | 22 km || 
|-id=777 bgcolor=#fefefe
| 3777 McCauley ||  ||  || May 5, 1981 || Palomar || C. S. Shoemaker || FLO || align=right | 5.3 km || 
|-id=778 bgcolor=#d6d6d6
| 3778 Regge ||  ||  || April 26, 1984 || La Silla || W. Ferreri || KOR || align=right | 8.7 km || 
|-id=779 bgcolor=#E9E9E9
| 3779 Kieffer ||  ||  || May 13, 1985 || Palomar || C. S. Shoemaker || EUN || align=right | 15 km || 
|-id=780 bgcolor=#d6d6d6
| 3780 Maury || 1985 RL ||  || September 14, 1985 || Anderson Mesa || E. Bowell || KOR || align=right | 12 km || 
|-id=781 bgcolor=#d6d6d6
| 3781 Dufek ||  ||  || September 2, 1986 || Kleť || A. Mrkos || KOR || align=right | 8.3 km || 
|-id=782 bgcolor=#fefefe
| 3782 Celle || 1986 TE ||  || October 3, 1986 || Brorfelde || P. Jensen || Vmoon || align=right | 5.9 km || 
|-id=783 bgcolor=#fefefe
| 3783 Morris ||  ||  || October 7, 1986 || Anderson Mesa || E. Bowell || — || align=right | 4.9 km || 
|-id=784 bgcolor=#d6d6d6
| 3784 Chopin ||  ||  || October 31, 1986 || Haute-Provence || E. W. Elst || — || align=right | 29 km || 
|-id=785 bgcolor=#d6d6d6
| 3785 Kitami || 1986 WM ||  || November 30, 1986 || Geisei || T. Seki || THM || align=right | 20 km || 
|-id=786 bgcolor=#E9E9E9
| 3786 Yamada || 1988 AE ||  || January 10, 1988 || Chiyoda || T. Kojima || MAR || align=right | 13 km || 
|-id=787 bgcolor=#d6d6d6
| 3787 Aivazovskij ||  ||  || September 11, 1977 || Nauchnij || N. S. Chernykh || ITH || align=right | 12 km || 
|-id=788 bgcolor=#E9E9E9
| 3788 Steyaert ||  ||  || August 29, 1986 || La Silla || H. Debehogne || GEF || align=right | 9.8 km || 
|-id=789 bgcolor=#d6d6d6
| 3789 Zhongguo || 1928 UF ||  || October 25, 1928 || Williams Bay || Y. C. Chang || 2:1J || align=right | 14 km || 
|-id=790 bgcolor=#d6d6d6
| 3790 Raywilson || 1937 UE ||  || October 26, 1937 || Heidelberg || K. Reinmuth || THM || align=right | 14 km || 
|-id=791 bgcolor=#d6d6d6
| 3791 Marci ||  ||  || November 17, 1981 || Kleť || A. Mrkos || KOR || align=right | 12 km || 
|-id=792 bgcolor=#fefefe
| 3792 Preston || 1985 FA ||  || March 22, 1985 || Palomar || C. S. Shoemaker || PHOmoon || align=right | 5.2 km || 
|-id=793 bgcolor=#C2FFFF
| 3793 Leonteus ||  ||  || October 11, 1985 || Palomar || C. S. Shoemaker || L4 || align=right | 112 km || 
|-id=794 bgcolor=#C2FFFF
| 3794 Sthenelos ||  ||  || October 12, 1985 || Palomar || C. S. Shoemaker || L4 || align=right | 35 km || 
|-id=795 bgcolor=#fefefe
| 3795 Nigel ||  ||  || April 8, 1986 || Palomar || E. F. Helin || — || align=right | 7.9 km || 
|-id=796 bgcolor=#E9E9E9
| 3796 Lene || 1986 XJ ||  || December 6, 1986 || Brorfelde || P. Jensen || — || align=right | 19 km || 
|-id=797 bgcolor=#d6d6d6
| 3797 Ching-Sung Yu || 1987 YL ||  || December 22, 1987 || Harvard Observatory || Oak Ridge Observatory || THM || align=right | 12 km || 
|-id=798 bgcolor=#fefefe
| 3798 de Jager || 2402 T-3 ||  || October 16, 1977 || Palomar || PLS || — || align=right | 4.7 km || 
|-id=799 bgcolor=#d6d6d6
| 3799 Novgorod ||  ||  || September 22, 1979 || Nauchnij || N. S. Chernykh || THM || align=right | 17 km || 
|-id=800 bgcolor=#FA8072
| 3800 Karayusuf || 1984 AB ||  || January 4, 1984 || Palomar || E. F. Helin || — || align=right | 1.6 km || 
|}

3801–3900 

|-bgcolor=#C2FFFF
| 3801 Thrasymedes || 1985 VS ||  || November 6, 1985 || Kitt Peak || Spacewatch || L4 || align=right | 34 km || 
|-id=802 bgcolor=#fefefe
| 3802 Dornburg ||  ||  || August 7, 1986 || Tautenburg Observatory || F. Börngen || FLO || align=right | 3.9 km || 
|-id=803 bgcolor=#d6d6d6
| 3803 Tuchkova ||  ||  || October 2, 1981 || Nauchnij || L. V. Zhuravleva || — || align=right | 38 km || 
|-id=804 bgcolor=#d6d6d6
| 3804 Drunina ||  ||  || October 8, 1969 || Nauchnij || L. I. Chernykh || KOR || align=right | 8.8 km || 
|-id=805 bgcolor=#E9E9E9
| 3805 Goldreich ||  ||  || February 28, 1981 || Siding Spring || S. J. Bus || EUN || align=right | 13 km || 
|-id=806 bgcolor=#E9E9E9
| 3806 Tremaine ||  ||  || March 1, 1981 || Siding Spring || S. J. Bus || — || align=right | 4.8 km || 
|-id=807 bgcolor=#fefefe
| 3807 Pagels ||  ||  || September 26, 1981 || Anderson Mesa || B. A. Skiff, N. G. Thomas || FLO || align=right | 5.5 km || 
|-id=808 bgcolor=#fefefe
| 3808 Tempel ||  ||  || March 24, 1982 || Tautenburg Observatory || F. Börngen || — || align=right | 4.7 km || 
|-id=809 bgcolor=#E9E9E9
| 3809 Amici || 1984 FA ||  || March 26, 1984 || Bologna || San Vittore Obs. || — || align=right | 8.2 km || 
|-id=810 bgcolor=#fefefe
| 3810 Aoraki || 1985 DX ||  || February 20, 1985 || Lake Tekapo || A. C. Gilmore, P. M. Kilmartin || — || align=right | 5.6 km || 
|-id=811 bgcolor=#E9E9E9
| 3811 Karma || 1953 TH ||  || October 13, 1953 || Turku || L. Oterma || KRM || align=right | 30 km || 
|-id=812 bgcolor=#d6d6d6
| 3812 Lidaksum ||  ||  || January 11, 1965 || Nanking || Purple Mountain Obs. || — || align=right | 34 km || 
|-id=813 bgcolor=#fefefe
| 3813 Fortov ||  ||  || August 30, 1970 || Nauchnij || T. M. Smirnova || FLO || align=right | 5.1 km || 
|-id=814 bgcolor=#d6d6d6
| 3814 Hoshi-no-mura || 1981 JA ||  || May 4, 1981 || Tōkai || T. Furuta || THM || align=right | 15 km || 
|-id=815 bgcolor=#E9E9E9
| 3815 König || 1959 GG ||  || April 15, 1959 || Heidelberg || A. König, G. Jackisch, W. Wenzel || KON || align=right | 20 km || 
|-id=816 bgcolor=#E9E9E9
| 3816 Chugainov ||  ||  || November 8, 1975 || Nauchnij || N. S. Chernykh || — || align=right | 12 km || 
|-id=817 bgcolor=#fefefe
| 3817 Lencarter ||  ||  || June 25, 1979 || Siding Spring || E. F. Helin, S. J. Bus || — || align=right | 3.4 km || 
|-id=818 bgcolor=#fefefe
| 3818 Gorlitsa ||  ||  || August 20, 1979 || Nauchnij || N. S. Chernykh || NYS || align=right | 8.8 km || 
|-id=819 bgcolor=#E9E9E9
| 3819 Robinson || 1983 AR ||  || January 12, 1983 || Anderson Mesa || B. A. Skiff || — || align=right | 10 km || 
|-id=820 bgcolor=#d6d6d6
| 3820 Sauval || 1984 DV ||  || February 25, 1984 || La Silla || H. Debehogne || EOS || align=right | 13 km || 
|-id=821 bgcolor=#d6d6d6
| 3821 Sonet ||  ||  || September 6, 1985 || La Silla || H. Debehogne || — || align=right | 15 km || 
|-id=822 bgcolor=#fefefe
| 3822 Segovia ||  ||  || February 21, 1988 || Geisei || T. Seki || — || align=right | 5.1 km || 
|-id=823 bgcolor=#d6d6d6
| 3823 Yorii ||  ||  || March 10, 1988 || Yorii || M. Arai, H. Mori || — || align=right | 12 km || 
|-id=824 bgcolor=#fefefe
| 3824 Brendalee || 1929 TK ||  || October 5, 1929 || Flagstaff || C. W. Tombaugh || — || align=right | 5.2 km || 
|-id=825 bgcolor=#fefefe
| 3825 Nürnberg || 1967 UR ||  || October 30, 1967 || Hamburg-Bergedorf || L. Kohoutek || FLO || align=right | 6.5 km || 
|-id=826 bgcolor=#fefefe
| 3826 Handel ||  ||  || October 27, 1973 || Tautenburg Observatory || F. Börngen || — || align=right | 4.8 km || 
|-id=827 bgcolor=#E9E9E9
| 3827 Zdeněkhorský || 1986 VU ||  || November 3, 1986 || Kleť || A. Mrkos || NEM || align=right | 12 km || 
|-id=828 bgcolor=#d6d6d6
| 3828 Hoshino || 1986 WC ||  || November 22, 1986 || Toyota || K. Suzuki, T. Urata || — || align=right | 19 km || 
|-id=829 bgcolor=#E9E9E9
| 3829 Gunma || 1988 EM ||  || March 10, 1988 || Chiyoda || T. Kojima || DOR || align=right | 24 km || 
|-id=830 bgcolor=#d6d6d6
| 3830 Trelleborg || 1986 RL ||  || September 11, 1986 || Brorfelde || P. Jensen || EOS || align=right | 18 km || 
|-id=831 bgcolor=#fefefe
| 3831 Pettengill ||  ||  || October 7, 1986 || Anderson Mesa || E. Bowell || FLO || align=right | 5.8 km || 
|-id=832 bgcolor=#d6d6d6
| 3832 Shapiro || 1981 QJ ||  || August 30, 1981 || Anderson Mesa || E. Bowell || THM || align=right | 16 km || 
|-id=833 bgcolor=#FA8072
| 3833 Calingasta || 1971 SC ||  || September 27, 1971 || El Leoncito || J. Gibson, C. U. Cesco || slow || align=right | 2.4 km || 
|-id=834 bgcolor=#E9E9E9
| 3834 Zappafrank || 1980 JE ||  || May 11, 1980 || Kleť || L. Brožek || — || align=right | 9.9 km || 
|-id=835 bgcolor=#E9E9E9
| 3835 Korolenko ||  ||  || September 23, 1977 || Nauchnij || N. S. Chernykh || EUN || align=right | 9.8 km || 
|-id=836 bgcolor=#fefefe
| 3836 Lem ||  ||  || September 22, 1979 || Nauchnij || N. S. Chernykh || — || align=right | 4.1 km || 
|-id=837 bgcolor=#fefefe
| 3837 Carr ||  ||  || May 6, 1981 || Palomar || C. S. Shoemaker || — || align=right | 6.8 km || 
|-id=838 bgcolor=#FFC2E0
| 3838 Epona || 1986 WA ||  || November 27, 1986 || Palomar || A. Maury || APO +1km || align=right | 2.7 km || 
|-id=839 bgcolor=#fefefe
| 3839 Bogaevskij || 1971 OU ||  || July 26, 1971 || Nauchnij || N. S. Chernykh || slow || align=right | 7.4 km || 
|-id=840 bgcolor=#fefefe
| 3840 Mimistrobell ||  ||  || October 9, 1980 || Palomar || C. S. Shoemaker || — || align=right | 5.2 km || 
|-id=841 bgcolor=#fefefe
| 3841 Dicicco ||  ||  || November 4, 1983 || Anderson Mesa || B. A. Skiff || FLOmoon || align=right | 6.3 km || 
|-id=842 bgcolor=#fefefe
| 3842 Harlansmith ||  ||  || March 21, 1985 || Anderson Mesa || E. Bowell || FLO || align=right | 7.0 km || 
|-id=843 bgcolor=#d6d6d6
| 3843 OISCA || 1987 DM ||  || February 28, 1987 || Gekko || Y. Oshima || 3:2 || align=right | 31 km || 
|-id=844 bgcolor=#E9E9E9
| 3844 Lujiaxi || 1966 BZ ||  || January 30, 1966 || Nanking || Purple Mountain Obs. || HEN || align=right | 16 km || 
|-id=845 bgcolor=#d6d6d6
| 3845 Neyachenko ||  ||  || September 22, 1979 || Nauchnij || N. S. Chernykh || 7:4 || align=right | 26 km || 
|-id=846 bgcolor=#d6d6d6
| 3846 Hazel ||  ||  || October 9, 1980 || Palomar || C. S. Shoemaker || — || align=right | 22 km || 
|-id=847 bgcolor=#d6d6d6
| 3847 Šindel ||  ||  || February 16, 1982 || Kleť || A. Mrkos || — || align=right | 19 km || 
|-id=848 bgcolor=#fefefe
| 3848 Analucia ||  ||  || March 21, 1982 || La Silla || H. Debehogne || — || align=right | 9.9 km || 
|-id=849 bgcolor=#fefefe
| 3849 Incidentia || 1984 FC ||  || March 31, 1984 || Anderson Mesa || E. Bowell || — || align=right | 5.8 km || 
|-id=850 bgcolor=#fefefe
| 3850 Peltier ||  ||  || October 7, 1986 || Anderson Mesa || E. Bowell || — || align=right | 5.6 km || 
|-id=851 bgcolor=#fefefe
| 3851 Alhambra || 1986 UZ ||  || October 30, 1986 || Geisei || T. Seki || — || align=right | 6.5 km || 
|-id=852 bgcolor=#d6d6d6
| 3852 Glennford ||  ||  || February 24, 1987 || La Silla || H. Debehogne || — || align=right | 19 km || 
|-id=853 bgcolor=#E9E9E9
| 3853 Haas ||  ||  || November 24, 1981 || Anderson Mesa || E. Bowell || — || align=right | 8.1 km || 
|-id=854 bgcolor=#FA8072
| 3854 George || 1983 EA ||  || March 13, 1983 || Palomar || C. S. Shoemaker, E. M. Shoemaker || H || align=right | 3.0 km || 
|-id=855 bgcolor=#fefefe
| 3855 Pasasymphonia ||  ||  || July 4, 1986 || Palomar || E. F. Helin || FLO || align=right | 5.7 km || 
|-id=856 bgcolor=#d6d6d6
| 3856 Lutskij || 1976 QX ||  || August 26, 1976 || Nauchnij || N. S. Chernykh || KOR || align=right | 10 km || 
|-id=857 bgcolor=#fefefe
| 3857 Cellino ||  ||  || February 8, 1984 || Anderson Mesa || E. Bowell || NYS || align=right | 5.8 km || 
|-id=858 bgcolor=#FA8072
| 3858 Dorchester || 1986 TG ||  || October 3, 1986 || Brorfelde || P. Jensen || — || align=right | 3.3 km || 
|-id=859 bgcolor=#d6d6d6
| 3859 Börngen || 1987 EW ||  || March 4, 1987 || Anderson Mesa || E. Bowell || — || align=right | 21 km || 
|-id=860 bgcolor=#E9E9E9
| 3860 Plovdiv ||  ||  || August 8, 1986 || Smolyan || E. W. Elst, V. G. Ivanova || GEF || align=right | 13 km || 
|-id=861 bgcolor=#E9E9E9
| 3861 Lorenz || A910 FA ||  || March 30, 1910 || Heidelberg || J. Helffrich || — || align=right | 8.2 km || 
|-id=862 bgcolor=#E9E9E9
| 3862 Agekian || 1972 KM ||  || May 18, 1972 || Nauchnij || T. M. Smirnova || — || align=right | 6.5 km || 
|-id=863 bgcolor=#fefefe
| 3863 Gilyarovskij ||  ||  || September 26, 1978 || Nauchnij || L. V. Zhuravleva || — || align=right | 6.5 km || 
|-id=864 bgcolor=#E9E9E9
| 3864 Søren || 1986 XF ||  || December 6, 1986 || Brorfelde || P. Jensen || — || align=right | 9.0 km || 
|-id=865 bgcolor=#fefefe
| 3865 Lindbloom ||  ||  || January 13, 1988 || La Silla || H. Debehogne || Vmoon || align=right | 8.0 km || 
|-id=866 bgcolor=#d6d6d6
| 3866 Langley ||  ||  || January 20, 1988 || La Silla || H. Debehogne || — || align=right | 23 km || 
|-id=867 bgcolor=#fefefe
| 3867 Shiretoko || 1988 HG ||  || April 16, 1988 || Kitami || M. Yanai, K. Watanabe || — || align=right | 5.3 km || 
|-id=868 bgcolor=#fefefe
| 3868 Mendoza || 4575 P-L ||  || September 24, 1960 || Palomar || PLS || moon || align=right | 8.6 km || 
|-id=869 bgcolor=#fefefe
| 3869 Norton || 1981 JE ||  || May 3, 1981 || Anderson Mesa || E. Bowell || — || align=right | 8.4 km || 
|-id=870 bgcolor=#E9E9E9
| 3870 Mayré ||  ||  || February 13, 1988 || La Silla || E. W. Elst || EUN || align=right | 12 km || 
|-id=871 bgcolor=#d6d6d6
| 3871 Reiz ||  ||  || February 18, 1982 || La Silla || R. M. West || URS || align=right | 20 km || 
|-id=872 bgcolor=#E9E9E9
| 3872 Akirafujii || 1983 AV ||  || January 12, 1983 || Anderson Mesa || B. A. Skiff || MIT || align=right | 13 km || 
|-id=873 bgcolor=#FA8072
| 3873 Roddy || 1984 WB ||  || November 21, 1984 || Palomar || C. S. Shoemaker || Hmoon || align=right | 5.0 km || 
|-id=874 bgcolor=#E9E9E9
| 3874 Stuart ||  ||  || October 4, 1986 || Anderson Mesa || E. Bowell || — || align=right | 8.5 km || 
|-id=875 bgcolor=#fefefe
| 3875 Staehle || 1988 KE ||  || May 17, 1988 || Palomar || E. F. Helin || FLO || align=right | 6.6 km || 
|-id=876 bgcolor=#d6d6d6
| 3876 Quaide || 1988 KJ ||  || May 19, 1988 || Palomar || E. F. Helin || EOS || align=right | 17 km || 
|-id=877 bgcolor=#E9E9E9
| 3877 Braes || 3108 P-L ||  || September 24, 1960 || Palomar || PLS || — || align=right | 9.6 km || 
|-id=878 bgcolor=#d6d6d6
| 3878 Jyoumon ||  ||  || November 14, 1982 || Kiso || H. Kosai, K. Furukawa || THM || align=right | 14 km || 
|-id=879 bgcolor=#fefefe
| 3879 Machar || 1983 QA ||  || August 16, 1983 || Kleť || Z. Vávrová || — || align=right | 5.7 km || 
|-id=880 bgcolor=#fefefe
| 3880 Kaiserman || 1984 WK ||  || November 21, 1984 || Palomar || C. S. Shoemaker, E. M. Shoemaker || H || align=right | 3.1 km || 
|-id=881 bgcolor=#fefefe
| 3881 Doumergua || 1925 VF ||  || November 15, 1925 || Algiers || B. Jekhovsky || NYS || align=right | 11 km || 
|-id=882 bgcolor=#fefefe
| 3882 Johncox || 1962 RN ||  || September 7, 1962 || Brooklyn || Indiana University || — || align=right | 5.9 km || 
|-id=883 bgcolor=#E9E9E9
| 3883 Verbano || 1972 RQ ||  || September 7, 1972 || Nauchnij || N. S. Chernykh || — || align=right | 12 km || 
|-id=884 bgcolor=#d6d6d6
| 3884 Alferov ||  ||  || March 13, 1977 || Nauchnij || N. S. Chernykh || THM || align=right | 13 km || 
|-id=885 bgcolor=#E9E9E9
| 3885 Bogorodskij ||  ||  || April 25, 1979 || Nauchnij || N. S. Chernykh || — || align=right | 15 km || 
|-id=886 bgcolor=#E9E9E9
| 3886 Shcherbakovia ||  ||  || September 3, 1981 || Nauchnij || N. S. Chernykh || — || align=right | 19 km || 
|-id=887 bgcolor=#d6d6d6
| 3887 Gerstner || 1985 QX ||  || August 22, 1985 || Kleť || A. Mrkos || EOS || align=right | 8.6 km || 
|-id=888 bgcolor=#fefefe
| 3888 Hoyt || 1984 FO ||  || March 28, 1984 || Palomar || C. S. Shoemaker || PHO || align=right | 5.2 km || 
|-id=889 bgcolor=#E9E9E9
| 3889 Menshikov ||  ||  || September 6, 1972 || Nauchnij || L. V. Zhuravleva || MIS || align=right | 14 km || 
|-id=890 bgcolor=#fefefe
| 3890 Bunin ||  ||  || December 18, 1976 || Nauchnij || L. I. Chernykh || V || align=right | 9.8 km || 
|-id=891 bgcolor=#fefefe
| 3891 Werner ||  ||  || March 3, 1981 || Siding Spring || S. J. Bus || NYS || align=right | 3.2 km || 
|-id=892 bgcolor=#E9E9E9
| 3892 Dezsö || 1941 HD ||  || April 19, 1941 || Turku || L. Oterma || EUN || align=right | 7.8 km || 
|-id=893 bgcolor=#fefefe
| 3893 DeLaeter ||  ||  || March 20, 1980 || Perth Observatory || M. P. Candy || — || align=right | 13 km || 
|-id=894 bgcolor=#E9E9E9
| 3894 Williamcooke ||  ||  || August 14, 1980 || Perth Observatory || P. Jekabsons, M. P. Candy || — || align=right | 8.8 km || 
|-id=895 bgcolor=#fefefe
| 3895 Earhart || 1987 DE ||  || February 23, 1987 || Palomar || C. S. Shoemaker || PHO || align=right | 10 km || 
|-id=896 bgcolor=#d6d6d6
| 3896 Pordenone || 1987 WB ||  || November 18, 1987 || Chions || J. M. Baur || EOS || align=right | 18 km || 
|-id=897 bgcolor=#E9E9E9
| 3897 Louhi || 1942 RT ||  || September 8, 1942 || Turku || Y. Väisälä || — || align=right | 11 km || 
|-id=898 bgcolor=#d6d6d6
| 3898 Curlewis ||  ||  || September 26, 1981 || Perth Observatory || M. P. Candy || THM || align=right | 16 km || 
|-id=899 bgcolor=#d6d6d6
| 3899 Wichterle ||  ||  || September 17, 1982 || Kleť || M. Mahrová || THM || align=right | 21 km || 
|-id=900 bgcolor=#fefefe
| 3900 Knežević || 1985 RK ||  || September 14, 1985 || Anderson Mesa || E. Bowell || — || align=right | 5.0 km || 
|}

3901–4000 

|-bgcolor=#E9E9E9
| 3901 Nanjingdaxue || 1958 GQ ||  || April 7, 1958 || Nanking || Purple Mountain Obs. || — || align=right | 19 km || 
|-id=902 bgcolor=#d6d6d6
| 3902 Yoritomo || 1986 AL ||  || January 14, 1986 || Karasuyama || S. Inoda, T. Urata || — || align=right | 28 km || 
|-id=903 bgcolor=#d6d6d6
| 3903 Kliment Ohridski ||  ||  || September 20, 1987 || Smolyan || E. W. Elst || KOR || align=right | 9.8 km || 
|-id=904 bgcolor=#E9E9E9
| 3904 Honda || 1988 DQ ||  || February 22, 1988 || Siding Spring || R. H. McNaught || — || align=right | 15 km || 
|-id=905 bgcolor=#E9E9E9
| 3905 Doppler || 1984 QO ||  || August 28, 1984 || Kleť || A. Mrkos || moon || align=right | 8.0 km || 
|-id=906 bgcolor=#d6d6d6
| 3906 Chao ||  ||  || May 31, 1987 || Palomar || C. S. Shoemaker || — || align=right | 46 km || 
|-id=907 bgcolor=#E9E9E9
| 3907 Kilmartin || A904 PC ||  || August 14, 1904 || Heidelberg || M. F. Wolf || — || align=right | 8.6 km || 
|-id=908 bgcolor=#FFC2E0
| 3908 Nyx || 1980 PA ||  || August 6, 1980 || La Silla || H.-E. Schuster || AMO +1km || align=right | 1.0 km || 
|-id=909 bgcolor=#E9E9E9
| 3909 Gladys ||  ||  || May 15, 1988 || Anderson Mesa || K. W. Zeigler || EUN || align=right | 10 km || 
|-id=910 bgcolor=#E9E9E9
| 3910 Liszt || 1988 SF ||  || September 16, 1988 || Haute-Provence || E. W. Elst || GEF || align=right | 12 km || 
|-id=911 bgcolor=#d6d6d6
| 3911 Otomo || 1940 QB ||  || August 31, 1940 || Heidelberg || K. Reinmuth || — || align=right | 19 km || 
|-id=912 bgcolor=#fefefe
| 3912 Troja || 1988 SG ||  || September 16, 1988 || Haute-Provence || E. W. Elst || moon || align=right | 5.9 km || 
|-id=913 bgcolor=#fefefe
| 3913 Chemin ||  ||  || December 2, 1986 || Caussols || CERGA || PHO || align=right | 6.4 km || 
|-id=914 bgcolor=#d6d6d6
| 3914 Kotogahama || 1987 SE ||  || September 16, 1987 || Geisei || T. Seki || EOS || align=right | 15 km || 
|-id=915 bgcolor=#fefefe
| 3915 Fukushima ||  ||  || August 15, 1988 || Kitami || M. Yanai, K. Watanabe || — || align=right | 22 km || 
|-id=916 bgcolor=#d6d6d6
| 3916 Maeva ||  ||  || August 24, 1981 || La Silla || H. Debehogne || THM || align=right | 20 km || 
|-id=917 bgcolor=#fefefe
| 3917 Franz Schubert || 1961 CX ||  || February 15, 1961 || Tautenburg Observatory || F. Börngen || — || align=right | 5.1 km || 
|-id=918 bgcolor=#fefefe
| 3918 Brel ||  ||  || August 13, 1988 || Haute-Provence || E. W. Elst || — || align=right | 6.3 km || 
|-id=919 bgcolor=#fefefe
| 3919 Maryanning || 1984 DS ||  || February 23, 1984 || La Silla || H. Debehogne || — || align=right | 4.8 km || 
|-id=920 bgcolor=#FA8072
| 3920 Aubignan || 1948 WF ||  || November 28, 1948 || Uccle || S. Arend || — || align=right | 6.0 km || 
|-id=921 bgcolor=#E9E9E9
| 3921 Klementʹev || 1971 OH ||  || July 19, 1971 || Nauchnij || B. A. Burnasheva || — || align=right | 17 km || 
|-id=922 bgcolor=#d6d6d6
| 3922 Heather ||  ||  || September 26, 1971 || Cerro El Roble || C. Torres || — || align=right | 14 km || 
|-id=923 bgcolor=#d6d6d6
| 3923 Radzievskij ||  ||  || September 24, 1976 || Nauchnij || N. S. Chernykh || SHU3:2 || align=right | 30 km || 
|-id=924 bgcolor=#E9E9E9
| 3924 Birch || 1977 CU ||  || February 11, 1977 || Palomar || E. Bowell, C. T. Kowal || — || align=right | 17 km || 
|-id=925 bgcolor=#d6d6d6
| 3925 Tretʹyakov ||  ||  || September 19, 1977 || Nauchnij || L. V. Zhuravleva || MEL || align=right | 51 km || 
|-id=926 bgcolor=#E9E9E9
| 3926 Ramirez ||  ||  || November 7, 1978 || Palomar || E. F. Helin, S. J. Bus || — || align=right | 3.9 km || 
|-id=927 bgcolor=#fefefe
| 3927 Feliciaplatt ||  ||  || May 5, 1981 || Palomar || C. S. Shoemaker, E. M. Shoemaker || — || align=right | 4.0 km || 
|-id=928 bgcolor=#fefefe
| 3928 Randa || 1981 PG ||  || August 4, 1981 || Zimmerwald || P. Wild || — || align=right | 5.7 km || 
|-id=929 bgcolor=#fefefe
| 3929 Carmelmaria ||  ||  || November 16, 1981 || Perth Observatory || P. Jekabsons || — || align=right | 6.0 km || 
|-id=930 bgcolor=#d6d6d6
| 3930 Vasilev ||  ||  || October 25, 1982 || Nauchnij || L. V. Zhuravleva || THM || align=right | 18 km || 
|-id=931 bgcolor=#fefefe
| 3931 Batten || 1984 EN ||  || March 1, 1984 || Anderson Mesa || E. Bowell || — || align=right | 3.1 km || 
|-id=932 bgcolor=#E9E9E9
| 3932 Edshay ||  ||  || September 27, 1984 || Palomar || M. C. Nolan, C. S. Shoemaker || — || align=right | 12 km || 
|-id=933 bgcolor=#d6d6d6
| 3933 Portugal ||  ||  || March 12, 1986 || La Silla || R. M. West || THM || align=right | 15 km || 
|-id=934 bgcolor=#E9E9E9
| 3934 Tove ||  ||  || February 23, 1987 || Brorfelde || P. Jensen, K. Augustesen, H. J. Fogh Olsen || EUN || align=right | 8.2 km || 
|-id=935 bgcolor=#E9E9E9
| 3935 Toatenmongakkai || 1987 PB ||  || August 14, 1987 || Geisei || T. Seki || slow || align=right | 9.6 km || 
|-id=936 bgcolor=#fefefe
| 3936 Elst || 2321 T-3 ||  || October 16, 1977 || Palomar || PLS || V || align=right | 4.7 km || 
|-id=937 bgcolor=#d6d6d6
| 3937 Bretagnon || 1932 EO ||  || March 14, 1932 || Heidelberg || K. Reinmuth || EOS || align=right | 16 km || 
|-id=938 bgcolor=#fefefe
| 3938 Chapront || 1949 PL ||  || August 2, 1949 || Heidelberg || K. Reinmuth || — || align=right | 9.8 km || 
|-id=939 bgcolor=#d6d6d6
| 3939 Huruhata || 1953 GO ||  || April 7, 1953 || Heidelberg || K. Reinmuth || — || align=right | 31 km || 
|-id=940 bgcolor=#fefefe
| 3940 Larion ||  ||  || March 27, 1973 || Nauchnij || L. V. Zhuravleva || H || align=right | 5.1 km || 
|-id=941 bgcolor=#d6d6d6
| 3941 Haydn ||  ||  || October 27, 1973 || Tautenburg Observatory || F. Börngen || KOR || align=right | 6.0 km || 
|-id=942 bgcolor=#fefefe
| 3942 Churivannia ||  ||  || September 11, 1977 || Nauchnij || N. S. Chernykh || — || align=right | 7.1 km || 
|-id=943 bgcolor=#fefefe
| 3943 Silbermann ||  ||  || September 3, 1981 || Tautenburg Observatory || F. Börngen || FLO || align=right | 5.6 km || 
|-id=944 bgcolor=#fefefe
| 3944 Halliday ||  ||  || November 24, 1981 || Anderson Mesa || E. Bowell || V || align=right | 5.9 km || 
|-id=945 bgcolor=#d6d6d6
| 3945 Gerasimenko || 1982 PL ||  || August 14, 1982 || Nauchnij || N. S. Chernykh || slow || align=right | 21 km || 
|-id=946 bgcolor=#d6d6d6
| 3946 Shor ||  ||  || March 5, 1983 || Nauchnij || L. G. Karachkina || THM || align=right | 17 km || 
|-id=947 bgcolor=#d6d6d6
| 3947 Swedenborg || 1983 XD ||  || December 1, 1983 || Anderson Mesa || E. Bowell || — || align=right | 16 km || 
|-id=948 bgcolor=#fefefe
| 3948 Bohr || 1985 RF ||  || September 15, 1985 || Brorfelde || P. Jensen || NYS || align=right | 5.1 km || 
|-id=949 bgcolor=#fefefe
| 3949 Mach || 1985 UL ||  || October 20, 1985 || Kleť || A. Mrkos || — || align=right | 6.1 km || 
|-id=950 bgcolor=#d6d6d6
| 3950 Yoshida || 1986 CH ||  || February 8, 1986 || Karasuyama || S. Inoda, T. Urata || EOS || align=right | 15 km || 
|-id=951 bgcolor=#fefefe
| 3951 Zichichi ||  ||  || February 13, 1986 || Bologna || San Vittore Obs. || moon || align=right | 6.7 km || 
|-id=952 bgcolor=#fefefe
| 3952 Russellmark ||  ||  || March 14, 1986 || Smolyan || Bulgarian National Obs. || NYS || align=right | 4.7 km || 
|-id=953 bgcolor=#fefefe
| 3953 Perth ||  ||  || November 6, 1986 || Anderson Mesa || E. Bowell || FLO || align=right | 4.8 km || 
|-id=954 bgcolor=#fefefe
| 3954 Mendelssohn || 1987 HU ||  || April 24, 1987 || Tautenburg Observatory || F. Börngen || — || align=right | 3.2 km || 
|-id=955 bgcolor=#d6d6d6
| 3955 Bruckner ||  ||  || September 9, 1988 || Tautenburg Observatory || F. Börngen || EOS || align=right | 18 km || 
|-id=956 bgcolor=#fefefe
| 3956 Caspar ||  ||  || November 3, 1988 || Brorfelde || P. Jensen || FLO || align=right | 5.4 km || 
|-id=957 bgcolor=#d6d6d6
| 3957 Sugie || 1933 OD ||  || July 24, 1933 || Heidelberg || K. Reinmuth || — || align=right | 23 km || 
|-id=958 bgcolor=#fefefe
| 3958 Komendantov || 1953 TC ||  || October 10, 1953 || Crimea-Simeis || P. F. Shajn || — || align=right | 6.1 km || 
|-id=959 bgcolor=#fefefe
| 3959 Irwin ||  ||  || October 28, 1954 || Brooklyn || Indiana University || — || align=right | 4.1 km || 
|-id=960 bgcolor=#E9E9E9
| 3960 Chaliubieju || 1955 BG ||  || January 20, 1955 || Nanking || Purple Mountain Obs. || — || align=right | 9.0 km || 
|-id=961 bgcolor=#E9E9E9
| 3961 Arthurcox || 1962 OB ||  || July 31, 1962 || Brooklyn || Indiana University || EUN || align=right | 10 km || 
|-id=962 bgcolor=#d6d6d6
| 3962 Valyaev || 1967 CC ||  || February 8, 1967 || Nauchnij || T. M. Smirnova || THM || align=right | 16 km || 
|-id=963 bgcolor=#fefefe
| 3963 Paradzhanov ||  ||  || October 8, 1969 || Nauchnij || L. I. Chernykh || NYS || align=right | 5.8 km || 
|-id=964 bgcolor=#E9E9E9
| 3964 Danilevskij ||  ||  || September 12, 1974 || Nauchnij || L. V. Zhuravleva || GEF || align=right | 6.0 km || 
|-id=965 bgcolor=#E9E9E9
| 3965 Konopleva ||  ||  || November 8, 1975 || Nauchnij || N. S. Chernykh || — || align=right | 9.5 km || 
|-id=966 bgcolor=#d6d6d6
| 3966 Cherednichenko ||  ||  || September 24, 1976 || Nauchnij || N. S. Chernykh || — || align=right | 21 km || 
|-id=967 bgcolor=#d6d6d6
| 3967 Shekhtelia ||  ||  || December 16, 1976 || Nauchnij || L. I. Chernykh || — || align=right | 29 km || 
|-id=968 bgcolor=#fefefe
| 3968 Koptelov ||  ||  || October 8, 1978 || Nauchnij || L. I. Chernykh || V || align=right | 5.4 km || 
|-id=969 bgcolor=#fefefe
| 3969 Rossi ||  ||  || October 9, 1978 || Nauchnij || L. V. Zhuravleva || — || align=right | 3.9 km || 
|-id=970 bgcolor=#E9E9E9
| 3970 Herran ||  ||  || June 28, 1979 || Cerro El Roble || C. Torres || MAR || align=right | 8.6 km || 
|-id=971 bgcolor=#d6d6d6
| 3971 Voronikhin ||  ||  || December 23, 1979 || Nauchnij || L. V. Zhuravleva || — || align=right | 32 km || 
|-id=972 bgcolor=#fefefe
| 3972 Richard ||  ||  || May 6, 1981 || Palomar || C. S. Shoemaker || — || align=right | 4.1 km || 
|-id=973 bgcolor=#fefefe
| 3973 Ogilvie ||  ||  || October 30, 1981 || Socorro || L. G. Taff || EUT || align=right | 6.2 km || 
|-id=974 bgcolor=#E9E9E9
| 3974 Verveer || 1982 FS ||  || March 28, 1982 || Anderson Mesa || E. Bowell || EUN || align=right | 8.3 km || 
|-id=975 bgcolor=#d6d6d6
| 3975 Verdi ||  ||  || October 19, 1982 || Tautenburg Observatory || F. Börngen || KOR || align=right | 9.7 km || 
|-id=976 bgcolor=#E9E9E9
| 3976 Lise || 1983 JM ||  || May 6, 1983 || Anderson Mesa || N. G. Thomas || — || align=right | 29 km || 
|-id=977 bgcolor=#E9E9E9
| 3977 Maxine || 1983 LM ||  || June 14, 1983 || Palomar || C. S. Shoemaker, E. M. Shoemaker || EUN || align=right | 12 km || 
|-id=978 bgcolor=#d6d6d6
| 3978 Klepešta ||  ||  || November 7, 1983 || Kleť || Z. Vávrová || SAN || align=right | 29 km || 
|-id=979 bgcolor=#d6d6d6
| 3979 Brorsen ||  ||  || November 8, 1983 || Kleť || A. Mrkos || — || align=right | 19 km || 
|-id=980 bgcolor=#d6d6d6
| 3980 Hviezdoslav || 1983 XU ||  || December 4, 1983 || Kleť || A. Mrkos || THM || align=right | 11 km || 
|-id=981 bgcolor=#d6d6d6
| 3981 Stodola || 1984 BL ||  || January 26, 1984 || Kleť || A. Mrkos || THMslow? || align=right | 22 km || 
|-id=982 bgcolor=#fefefe
| 3982 Kastelʹ ||  ||  || May 2, 1984 || Nauchnij || L. G. Karachkina || moon || align=right | 6.8 km || 
|-id=983 bgcolor=#fefefe
| 3983 Sakiko || 1984 SX ||  || September 20, 1984 || Kleť || A. Mrkos || — || align=right | 16 km || 
|-id=984 bgcolor=#fefefe
| 3984 Chacos ||  ||  || September 21, 1984 || La Silla || H. Debehogne || NYS || align=right | 7.6 km || 
|-id=985 bgcolor=#d6d6d6
| 3985 Raybatson || 1985 CX ||  || February 12, 1985 || Palomar || C. S. Shoemaker || BRA || align=right | 20 km || 
|-id=986 bgcolor=#fefefe
| 3986 Rozhkovskij ||  ||  || September 19, 1985 || Nauchnij || N. S. Chernykh || FLO || align=right | 6.8 km || 
|-id=987 bgcolor=#E9E9E9
| 3987 Wujek ||  ||  || March 5, 1986 || Anderson Mesa || E. Bowell || — || align=right | 14 km || 
|-id=988 bgcolor=#FFC2E0
| 3988 Huma || 1986 LA ||  || June 4, 1986 || Palomar || E. F. Helin || AMO +1km || align=right data-sort-value="0.7" | 700 m || 
|-id=989 bgcolor=#fefefe
| 3989 Odin || 1986 RM ||  || September 8, 1986 || Brorfelde || P. Jensen || — || align=right | 3.8 km || 
|-id=990 bgcolor=#d6d6d6
| 3990 Heimdal ||  ||  || September 25, 1987 || Brorfelde || P. Jensen || HIL3:2 || align=right | 36 km || 
|-id=991 bgcolor=#fefefe
| 3991 Basilevsky ||  ||  || September 26, 1987 || Anderson Mesa || E. Bowell || FLO || align=right | 5.6 km || 
|-id=992 bgcolor=#d6d6d6
| 3992 Wagner ||  ||  || September 29, 1987 || Tautenburg Observatory || F. Börngen || EOS || align=right | 17 km || 
|-id=993 bgcolor=#E9E9E9
| 3993 Šorm ||  ||  || November 4, 1988 || Kleť || A. Mrkos || — || align=right | 8.4 km || 
|-id=994 bgcolor=#E9E9E9
| 3994 Ayashi || 1988 XF ||  || December 2, 1988 || Ayashi Station || M. Koishikawa || — || align=right | 14 km || 
|-id=995 bgcolor=#E9E9E9
| 3995 Sakaino || 1988 XM ||  || December 5, 1988 || Chiyoda || T. Kojima || — || align=right | 9.5 km || 
|-id=996 bgcolor=#fefefe
| 3996 Fugaku ||  ||  || December 5, 1988 || Yorii || M. Arai, H. Mori || — || align=right | 5.2 km || 
|-id=997 bgcolor=#fefefe
| 3997 Taga ||  ||  || December 6, 1988 || Dynic || A. Sugie || NYS || align=right | 9.6 km || 
|-id=998 bgcolor=#fefefe
| 3998 Tezuka || 1989 AB ||  || January 1, 1989 || Chiyoda || T. Kojima || — || align=right | 6.9 km || 
|-id=999 bgcolor=#fefefe
| 3999 Aristarchus || 1989 AL ||  || January 5, 1989 || Chiyoda || T. Kojima || — || align=right | 18 km || 
|-id=000 bgcolor=#E9E9E9
| 4000 Hipparchus || 1989 AV ||  || January 4, 1989 || Kushiro || S. Ueda, H. Kaneda || — || align=right | 17 km || 
|}

References

External links 
 Discovery Circumstances: Numbered Minor Planets (1)–(5000) (IAU Minor Planet Center)

0003